An official state car is a vehicle used by a government to transport its head of state or head of government in an official capacity, which may also be used occasionally to transport other members of the government or visiting dignitaries from other countries. A few countries bring their own official state car for state visits to other countries, for instance, the United States, Russia, the United Kingdom, South Korea, Germany and Japan. It also may serve as an automotive symbol of the head of state and their country. An official state car must have adequate security, capability and stateliness for its duty. A limousine, F-segment, luxury car or executive car is usually selected.

Due to the high security risk of the passengers, these vehicles are often heavily secured and protected. Vehicles may be armored by the manufacturer or an after-market specialist. (In this article the term "armored car" invariably means a reinforced civilian vehicle, not the military vehicle). When carrying an important passenger, state vehicles may be surrounded by a motorcade consisting of police or military personnel. The vehicle's driver might also be from the law enforcement or military pool; the driver of the United States Presidential State Car is an experienced agent from the Secret Service, the British prime minister is driven by a Specialist Protection officer from the Metropolitan Police Service, and the Canadian prime minister is driven by a Protective Services officer from the RCMP.

In some cases state cars may bear standard number plates; in others special or no plates are used.

Sourcing 
In countries that have domestic automobile manufacturers, the government will usually commission one of the national automakers to provide a state car, or allow several to provide cars for an official state fleet. It is considered an honour for a car manufacturer to be selected to provide a state car for their respective country and a demonstration of the confidence of a government in their national industry. For example, the president of the United States currently uses a Cadillac with special undisclosed security features commissioned by the United States government, built by General Motors. Historically the President also used Lincoln, manufactured by Ford Motor Company and also Chrysler vehicles having been used in the past, representing the Detroit Three of American manufacturers. Soviet leaders used custom-built limousines made by the ZiL company, and though the Russian presidents switched to the Mercedes-Benz S-Class due to ZiL's decline after the dissolution of the Soviet Union, Vladimir Putin commissioned a new official state car from the national automotive establishment, which was delivered in early 2018. In 2018 the Government of South Korea commissioned a highly modified Hyundai Nexo SUV to serve as the official state car of South Korea. The emperor of Japan uses a Toyota Century, the prime minister of Italy uses a Maserati, the prime minister of Malaysia uses a Proton Perdana, the president of the Czech Republic is driven around in a Škoda Superb, and the British monarch uses a Bentley. Members of the British royal family are driven in Jaguars, though other makes may be used in other Commonwealth realms. The president of France can choose from cars manufactured by Renault or PSA Peugeot Citroën, and all major German manufacturers (Mercedes-Benz, BMW and Volkswagen Group) are represented in Germany's pool of vehicles available for use by state officials. The prime minister of India uses a Land Rover Sentinel high security edition as Jaguar and Land Rover are owned by Tata Motors, an Indian automobile company though they are manufactured in the UK.

For countries without major indigenous manufacturers, an official state car may be purchased from a suitable manufacturer in a nation with strong economic and diplomatic ties. Canada typically aims to exclusively use state cars manufactured by the Detroit Three, many of which are made in Canadian factories, with the United States and American car manufacturers having a historically strong relationship with Canada.  These companies have a well established and rich manufacturing history dating back to the 1920s in Ontario.

Countries
The following information lists some state cars and their users of sovereign states and other territories; the list is likely to be out of date in some cases as incumbents and cars change.

Afghanistan 
The president of Afghanistan traveled in a convoy of armored Toyota Land Cruiser J200s without registration plates.

Albania 
The current president of Albania rides in his Mercedes-Benz S350 escorted by a motorcade consisting of black SUV

Argentina 

The president of Argentina 
Alberto Fernández has a Toyota Corolla accompanied by the Presidential Security using 4×4 Toyota Hilux SW4 and Toyota Corolla.

Armenia 
The current president of Armenia is driven in a 4th generation Audi A8, escorted by a motorcade consisting of black Mercedes-Benz G-Class SUVs.

Australia

Governor-general and state governors 

The governor-general of Australia travels in a Rolls-Royce Phantom VI limousine for ceremonial occasions, such as the State Opening of Parliament. He more commonly uses a white ballistic and bullet-proof armoured BMW 7 series when on official business. The official cars of the governor-general fly the flag of the governor-general of Australia and display St. Edward's Crown instead of number plates.

A similar arrangement is used for the governors of the six states. When the king is in Australia, the king's personal Australian flag is flown on the car in which he is travelling. During Queen Elizabeth II's 2011 visit to Australia, the queen and the duke of Edinburgh were driven in a Range Rover Vogue.

Prime minister 

The official state car of the prime minister of Australia is a white ballistic and bullet-proof armoured BMW 7 Series, supported at all times by an armoured BMW X5. Prior to 2013, vehicles in the prime ministerial fleet were white Ford Territory and Holden Caprice models. The prime ministerial vehicle is also escorted by police vehicles from state and federal authorities. The prime minister's car bears the number plate C1 (meaning "Commonwealth One") and a centrally mounted Australian flag. The prime ministerial car fleet operates as part of COMCAR, a division of the Australian Government's Department of Finance.

In 2013, BMW was selected to provide a fleet of 7 Series High Security vehicles as part of a tender to replace the ageing armoured Holden Caprice fleet that formerly transported the Australian prime minister. The off-the-shelf replacements offer greater protection and better value for money. A BAE and GM-Holden Consortium also bid for the contract.

Austria 
Senior government figures in Austria use Audi A8, BMW 7 Series and Mercedes-Benz S-Class models.

Azerbaijan 
President of Azerbaijan Ilham Aliyev travels in an armored Maybach 62 limousine.
Sometimes he uses a heavy armored, custom-built Mercedes-Benz W221 S600 Guard Pullman.

Bangladesh 
The prime minister of Bangladesh travels in an armoured BMW 7 Series, as well as an armoured Mercedes-Benz G-Class SUV and a Maybach. Previously, the car was a Nissan Armada SUV.

Belgium 

The Belgian king, Philippe, uses a Mercedes-Benz S-Class or a BMW 7 Series, mostly with the number plate '1', because he is the commander in chief of the army. For his inauguration, a Mercedes-Benz 600 landaulette was used. All royal family members drive cars with only numbers.

The prime minister of Belgium, []], uses an Audi A6. Federal government officials drive cars with number plates starting with an "A" followed by one to three numbers. Regional government officials drive cars with number plates starting with an "E" followed by one to three numbers. Members of parliament and the senate drive cars with number plates starting with a "P" followed by three numbers.

For personal use, Queen Paola of Belgium drives a Fiat 500 with diplomatic plates. Prince Laurent of Belgium is famous for his speed driving and his fast cars. There is also a Mercedes-Benz 600 and a 1965 Lincoln Continental Convertible in the royal garage. Baudouin of Belgium ordered in the 1970s an armored De Tomaso Deauville. He had also an Aston Martin DB2/4. For their marriage in 1960, Baudouin and Fabiola used a 1955 Cadillac Series 62 Convertible, with a bulletproof bubble-top.

Belize 
The current governor-general of Belize and the current prime minister of Belize are both driven in a Genesis EQ900 Convertible bearing the Belizean flag and the standard of that office. Ministers generally use Toyota Prado or Ford Excursion, bearing either government plates or civilian plates with tags.

Previously, the governor-general of Belize and the prime minister of Belize are both driven in various cars.

Bhutan 
The king of Bhutan, Jigme Khesar Namgyel Wangchuck is driven in a Lexus LX 570, escorted by a Jeep Wrangler of the Royal Bodyguard of Bhutan.

Bolivia 
The president of Bolivia is driven in an armoured Lexus LS 460L and escorted by four Toyota Land Cruisers.

Brazil 

The ceremonial state car of the president of Brazil is a 1952 Rolls-Royce Silver Wraith, reserved exclusively for Independence Day commemorations, state visits and the presidential inauguration. The official state car used by the president for regular transportation is a 2011-model armored version of the Ford Fusion Hybrid. The car is also used as escort car for the presidential motorcade. The Fusion was first used on 17 June 2008  when it replaced a 2004 Chevrolet Omega.

In February 2012 the Brazilian government bought 12 Canadian-built Ford Edge models, 10 of which armored, for the use of President Dilma Rousseff and her security team.

The federal government's most important officials (President, ministers, magistrates, etc.) use yellow-green brass plates adorned with the coat of arms of Brazil and their titles engraved on them (e.g., President of the Republic, President of the Senate, Defense Minister, Supreme Court president, etc.).

Brunei 
The ceremonial state car of the sultan of Brunei is a 1992 state landaulette Rolls-Royce Phantom VI. On non-ceremonial occasions, the sultan of Brunei personally drives a black Mercedes-Benz M-Class W163 ML55 AMG, usually escorted by either a Secret Service BMW E39 540i or a BMW E61 545i, and a few Lexus LX470. Recently, the Sultan drives around in a black Brabus G700. On other occasions he drives a Maybach 62. The sultan and his brother Prince Jefri Bolkiah own several luxury and exotic cars, one of the largest collections in the world.

Queen Saleha of Brunei is usually driven around in a 2012 Rolls Royce Phantom Series II.

The members of the royal family are usually escorted by a Secret Service escort of Volvo S80 V8 models, or Mitsubishi 380.

The cabinet ministers of Brunei and visiting foreign dignitaries are driven in a black Mercedes Benz W221 S350L, while other senior ranking officials are driven in a black Mercedes Benz W211 E280.

The sultan drives a Mercedes-Benz G-Class, the 2009 facelifted G55 AMG instead of the W163 ML55 AMG.

Bulgaria 
The cars of the president of Bulgaria include Mercedes-Benz S600 and BMW 5 Series and BMW 7 Series. The prime minister is driven in a Toyota Land Cruiser, he very often drives it himself with the security guards sitting in the back of the car. The prime minister is also driven in a black BMW X5. The pilot cars are usually Ford, Toyota or Audi A6 and Audi A8. As of 18 December, the prime minister and the president of Bulgaria are transported in a top-of-the-line Mercedes S600 Guard, 517 hp.

Cambodia
The royal king of Cambodia Norodom Sihamoni is driven in a black Mercedes S-Class 600 with the Royal Palace plate number and the logo of Royal Standard of the King of Cambodia behind. The king has owned two black Mercedes-Benz 600s and also a black Lexus SUV and uses an armoured Range Rover Sentinel stretch for his visits to provinces and rural area.

The prime minister of the Kingdom of Cambodia has owned more than four Mercedes-Benz guard cars and more than five Chevrolet Suburbans in his houses. He also had a black Mercedes-Benz S-Class 600 Carat Duchatelet bullet proof with plate number 2Z-9999 and another black Mercedes-Benz S600 (V221) with plate number 2AA-9999 and two gold Mercedes-Benz S600 (W220)s.

Cameroon
The president of Cameroon, Paul Biya, uses an armoured Range Rover Sentinel as his official car. Other vehicles forming part of his motorcade include Toyota Land Cruisers which transport his security detail.

Canada 

In 1926, in anticipation of the 1927 royal tour of Canada undertaken by Prince Edward of Wales (later the duke of Windsor) and his brother, Prince George, Duke of Kent, the first state cars of Canada, two Mclaughlin-Buick seven passenger open touring cars were constructed for their use by General Motors Canada. Mclaughlin Motor Car Company, was a Canadian automobile company that produced cars under the marque Mclaughlin, later branded Mclaughlin-Buick, that was purchased in 1918 by General Motors and became its Canadian subsidiary. Two McLaughlin-Buick Phaetons were built for the 1939 Royal tour of Canada. One of these later carried Prince Charles and Diana, Princess of Wales, during their 1986 visit to Canada. It is believed that during the 1927 Royal tour of Canada, Edward VIII had stated that he favored American cars, and thus this set the standard for American cars being selected in the future to be official state cars of Canada.

The monarch of Canada and governor general of Canada are currently driven in a Lincoln Continental, with the appropriate flag of office on a metal flagstaff affixed to the right-side front fender. The sovereign's car bears a licence plate with a gold St. Edward's Crown on a red field. The governor general's car bears a standard licence plate of the province of Ontario, but the car displays the governor general's flag to distinguish it. The governor general has also been driven in a Chevrolet Suburban or at times in a Cadillac DTS stretched limousine. All vehicles are from the VIP fleet of the Royal Canadian Mounted Police.

The prime minister of Canada is driven in a motorcade of typically ten cars and four motorcycles. The motorcade's size is adjusted for certain events, as seen fit by the Royal Canadian Mounted Police. The prime minister usually rides in an armored Chevrolet Suburban or long-wheelbase Cadillac DTS, but he has also in some cases been seen arriving at certain events in a minivan when travelling with members of his family. The prime minister's vehicle bears a standard Ontario licence plate. The motorcade is usually led by a Chrysler 300 sedan.

Certain government ministers and officials are driven in Chrysler 300 sedans. 

Historically, Canadian Prime Ministers were usually driven in Cadillac limousines.

Chile 

Official ceremonial vehicle

The president of Chile traditionally uses an horse drawn "Bandeja" Carriage imported from France by President José Manuel Balmaceda for ceremonial events.

In 1968, Queen Elizabeth made a state visit to Chile in which she and then president, Eduardo Frei Montalva, travelled together in a 1966 Ford Galaxie XL, reportedly donated by either Ford Brasil or Queen Elizabeth herself, and has been customised with Queen Elizabeth's royal arms on the steering wheel.  

The 1966 model Ford Galaxie began production in Brazil for South America in 1967 so it's plausible they would donate a vehicle knowing the promotional value its use would receive, and in fact provided other vehicles in Brazil for the queen's visit there prior to her visiting Chile, although the unlikely story of a British queen giving Chile a car built in Brazil by an American manufacturer has become an enduring myth.

Montalva's successor, socialist Salvador Allende, not wanting to convey the image of royalty that carriages now confer, decided the more plebeian Ford better fit his image and used it for his inauguration, adopting the vehicle as his official vehicle, with a normally issued license plate (EL-2801). The Galaxie has since transported dignitaries such as Fidel Castro, Indira Gandhi and Pablo Neruda. Gabriel Boric was the first president officially driven in the Galaxie by a female driver during his inauguration.
 
Both the carriage and the Galaxie have since been maintained by the state and are now used only for official ceremonies, such as presidential inaugurations on 11 March every four years, state visits, and the national holidays on 21 May and 19 September.

Daily transportation

President Ricardo Lagos used a Lincoln Town Car, while President Michelle Bachelet introduced a 2008-model Peugeot 607 saloon in her first term in office. Her motorcade was also often seen driving 2006 Audi A4 and A6s. Various Dodge Durangos also composed the presidential motorcade.

During his first term, Sebastián Piñera was the first to switch to an Asian manufacturer, recognizing their increasing market share in Chile, choosing a Lexus LS 600h as his daily transport. Bachelet introduced the use of a Hyundai Equus in 2014 for her second term, a marque that has continued into Piñera's second term in 2018 with his choice of the Genesis G90. 

La Moneda staff currently accompanies the president in Hyundai Santa Fe and Hyundai Sonata chase vehicles. Hyundai has long been a favored brand for the Chilean government since the signing of a free trade agreement in 2003, overtaking Chevrolet as the best selling auto brand in Chile in 2017.

China 

Before production began of the Hongqi, Chinese leaders used various foreign luxury cars. For example, Chairman Mao Zedong used a bullet-proofed ZIS-115 given by Stalin, while Premier Zhou Enlai used a GAZ-12 ZIM, later a ZIL-115 and Foreign Minister Chen Yi used a Mercedes Benz 600 Pullman before Hongqi began production of its CA770. Since the 1960s Chinese leaders have traditionally used limousines produced under the Hongqi brand for official events. Before the new Hongqi HQE (official name L9) was introduced, the Chinese leaders used a special version of CA770 limousine to review the troops on National Days. During former leader Hu Jintao's review of troops on National Day in 2009, he was seen in a Hongqi HQE Limousine. The HQE is powered by an aluminium V12 cylinder engine of Chinese design (designation CA12VG), with a displacement of 6.0 liters and producing 370 kW (470 hp) at 5600 rpm and 550 N m (405 lb·ft) of torque at 4400 rpm. It is bulletproof, completely hand built and comes with run-flat tyres.
When the Kuomintang was still in power, Provisional president Sun Yat-sen used a Ford Model T and his successor Chiang Kai-shek used an armoured Packard limousine in China and a Cadillac 75 armoured limo in Taiwan.

In the early 90s, Chinese leaders switched to using minibuses, such as the Toyota Coaster, or Hongqi CA630 for short-distance trips.

When visiting a foreign country, Chinese leaders generally use vehicles supplied by the host country. This custom began to change in November 2014, when Xi Jinping, General Secretary of the Communist Party, used his own Hongqi L5 limousine on a state visit to New Zealand. Chinese premiers continue to use cars supplied by the host country.

Colombia 

The Colombian presidential vehicles have usually been state secret-armored BMWs. As of 2022, the presidential fleet includes four Israeli made armored BMW 7 Series and several units of Toyota Land Cruiser Sahara, whose level of armor is a state secret. These BMWs and Toyotas are equipped with GPS and run-flat tires, as well as a gas-proof chamber for defense against gas attacks, and a reinforced chassis with a steel plate under each vehicle protecting them against bombs, IEDs and grenades rolled under the car. The motorcade is made up of 3 BMWs plus 8 Toyota Sahara's, all armored, plus a Prado armored level IIIA used by The National Intelligence Directorate, an ambulance and no less than 8 motorcycles. All the vehicles have presidential tags.

Costa Rica 
The president of Costa Rica, Rodrigo Chaves Robles, uses two Toyota Land Cruiser. Before, a Hyundai Equus limo, donated by the government of South Korea was used as the Presidential State Car. In addition, the presidency owns Land Rover Discovery 4 turbodiesel. Land Cruiser its been part of the presidential house fleet.

Croatia 
The president of Croatia is driven in an armored black BMW 7 Series and escorted by a selection of marked and unmarked BMW and Audi models driven by the members of the Croatian Secret Service. The president occasionally uses Volkswagen Passat and Mercedes-Benz E250. These vehicles are part of the vehicle fleet of the Honor Guard Battalion.

The prime minister of Croatia and speaker of the Croatian Parliament, similar to the president, are driven in an armored Black BMW 7 Series with an escort, while government ministers use BMW 5 Series and Audi A6. These vehicles are part of the vehicle fleet of
Ministry of the Interior's Department of Protection of Protected Persons.

Cuba 
Fidel Castro used Soviet-made ZiL limousines as his state cars, the cars were used to welcome both Mikhail Gorbachev and Jimmy Carter.

Castro was also spotted using a GAZ-69 during Hugo Chávez's visit to Havana in 2002.

Czech Republic 

The current president of the Czech Republic, Miloš Zeman, uses the Czech-made Škoda Superb in top-end 'Laurin & Klement' trim.

Historically, presidents of Czechoslovakia were driven in cars manufactured by Škoda (Hispano-Suiza and VOS), Praga (Grand and Golden), Tatra (80, 603 and 613), Daimler (EL24 and DE36), ZiL (110, 111, 114 and 115) and GAZ (12-ZIM and M13-Čajka). After 1989, Czech presidents used Renault 21, BMW 735i and 750i, Mercedes-Benz 600 SEL, Audi A8 4.2 and thereafter Škoda Superb.

Democratic Republic of the Congo 
The current president of DR Congo rides in his Mercedes-Maybach S600 and escorted by Toyota Land Cruiser 70 SUVs.

Denmark 

Queen Margrethe II uses a 1958 Rolls-Royce Silver Wraith seven-seater limousine (LGLW 25 body no. 10181), commonly referred to as "Store Krone" (Great Crown). It was purchased by her father, Frederick IX of Denmark, as new. The coachbuilder and seller was Hooper & Co. in London.

In addition, she uses several lesser cars for more common occasions. Noteworthy are Krone (Crown) 1, 2 and 5, which are all Daimler DS420 eight-seater limousines made in 1970, 1989 (purchased in 1994 with 1500 km on the odometer) and 1986. There was also a Bentley Arnage that was replaced by a Bentley Mulsanne in 2012. The name Krone with a number, like Krone 121, refers to the license plate used when carrying members of the Danish royal family inside Denmark.

The queen also uses a hybrid limousine, the Lexus LS 600h L. In July 2016, the queen and prince-consort used a stretched Volvo S80 by Nilsson. Crown Prince Frederik has been using a fully electric Tesla Model S since the summer of 2013.

The current prime minister of Denmark uses an Audi A8 L. The former one was driven in an armored Mercedes-Benz S-Class. The ministers in the Danish government have different cars, including the VW Phaeton, BMW 5 Series, BMW 7 Series, Audi A6, Audi A8 and Mercedes-Benz S-Class.

Dominican Republic 
The president of the Dominican Republic, Luis Abinader uses a black Tesla Model S and a black Lincoln Navigator, which can be seen normally with the 0–1 plate (Presidential Plate) and it is mostly chosen by the government for its reliability and bulletproof armor, a black Ford Expedition which was used during his campaign and is now being used as a security car and back up, a black BMW 7 Series used the inaugural parade, only used to go to events in or near the Distrito Nacional, Santo Domingo. All of the cars have been modified with bullet-proof tires and bullet-proof windows. The Presidential Plate will be changed to the car that the president will use for the day. The Escort teams use black Toyota 4Runner fourth and fifth generation, Toyota Fortuner, and Toyota Land Cruiser Prado J120 and the J150 on the motorcade.

Since 2013, the fleet of official state vehicles for the Governor of the state or province were changed from first generation Nissan X-Trail and Nissan Frontier D22 to new 2014 Mitsubishi Montero fourth generation. They could also use their own personal vehicles.

Ecuador 
The presidential state car in Ecuador is an armored Lincoln Town Car purchased by president Lucio Gutierrez in 2005.  An armored Chevrolet Trooper is also used. Before that, Abdala Bucaram and Rosalia Arteaga used an armored Volvo 900 Series in 1996 to 1997. The president Rafael Correa used to travel in one of several armored Nissan Patrol scholastic level 7 for several Ford Explorer, Chevrolet D-Max and Toyota Hilux. On 30 September 2011, the Nissan Patrol withstood high-caliber ammunition in the midst of a shooting in the police hospital in the city of Quito. The Nissan Patrol fleet was changed for Toyota Land Cruiser 200s. The current president Lenin Moreno uses a fleet of Mitsubishi Outlander jeeps for himself and his guards, in behalf of his austerity policies.

Egypt 
The presidential state car in Egypt used by Hosni Mubarak until February 2011 was a black armored 1998 Mercedes-Benz S-Class. An earlier model of it helped save his life in Ethiopia in 1995. The current vehicle used by Abdel Fattah el-Sisi is a black armored variant of the 2013 Mercedes Benz S-Class with a special black number plate with the presidential crest above an Arabic 1. Ministers and highly placed government officials are sometimes seen driving black BMW 7 Series, or Audi A8s, all with special government number plates. Parliamentary vehicles are often Mercedes-Benz E-Class.

El Salvador 
The president of El Salvador uses an armored Mercedes-Benz W220 as its official state car. He also drives or is driven in a Lexus LX 570, a Hummer H3, a Jeep Grand Cherokee SRT-8, a Chevrolet Suburban and a 200 Series Toyota Land Cruiser. The president is generally escorted by six Toyota Land Cruiser Prados.

Estonia 
During the first republic (1918–1940), the first president, Konstantin Päts, preferred American cars, such as the Studebaker Dictator. After officially becoming a President in 1938, he also bought a Packard Super 8 Touring Sedan, and in the following year a Studebaker Commander Cruising Sedan.

The president of Estonia uses a Mercedes-Benz S350dL with the coat of arms of Estonia as its license plate. The car is escorted by an Audi Q7. The Prime Minister of Estonia uses an Audi A8L registered in 2015.

Finland 

The president of Finland uses an armoured Mercedes-Benz S600L with the coat of arms of Finland in lieu of a license plate. Armoured Audi A8Ls are used for visiting dignitaries and government officials. A similar car is used by the speaker of the Parliament, whereas the prime minister's official car is a grey armoured Mercedes-Benz S600 Guard.

Finnish cabinet members carpool consists of BMW 5-Series and Mercedes E-Class models.

France 

The president of France can choose between several armoured versions of high-end French cars including the Citroën DS5 Hybrid4, Citroën C6, Renault Vel Satis and Peugeot 607. These are traditionally provided by the manufacturers and different presidents will have their own preference. Jacques Chirac preferred Citroën while François Mitterrand was a Renault fan, occasionally using his own Renault 5 model and the presidential Renault Safrane.

For his inauguration parade in 2007, Sarkozy used the one-off Peugeot 607 Paladine model, a stretched limousine with landaulette body, originally built as a concept car in 2000. The model was brought out of storage for the occasion and updated with a new grille and lights to bring it in line with the 2004 re-style of the mainstream model. It has since been returned to Peugeot and, as it effectively remains a concept car in its fit and finish, will not become part of the Élysée fleet. President Hollande used a one-off convertible version of the Citroën DS5 Hybrid4 for his inauguration parade on 15 May 2012. The car, owned by Citroën, has since been displayed at various events throughout the world. President François Hollande was usually chauffeured in an armoured Citroën C6, although he has been known to make private trips by moped. President Emmanuel Macron has used a DS 7 Crossback as the first luxury SUV by French manufacturer DS Automobiles for his investiture. But for his day to day travel, he uses an armoured Peugeot 5008 and a Renault Espace, also the Acmat military command car for the military parade.

The most famous association between a president of France and a single model was that of Charles de Gaulle with the Citroën DS, as portrayed in the film, The Day of the Jackal. The president was saved in two assassination attempts by French Algeria supporters by the car's unique ability to drive on three wheels and to keep running when more than one tyre is punctured.

For ceremonial occasions, the president also has access to two special open top Citroën SM Présidentielle models, created for President Georges Pompidou by the coach-builder Henri Chapron. Based on the SM Opera, itself a special edition four-door coupé, these cars are still used for state occasions and military parades, when the open-top layout enables the president to stand in the back seat and survey the crowd. Built for an official visit by Queen Elizabeth II in 1972, the cars have a standard mechanical layout with the addition of a special gear for low-speed cruising. One of these cars was also used by President François Mitterrand for the official opening of the Channel Tunnel in 1994, when it accompanied the Rolls-Royce Phantom VI of Elizabeth II. Number plates on these cars are standard French ones, although specially created for the model (2 PR 75 and 3 PR 75, '75' denoting the Paris region). Both are still maintained in working order, but are now rarely seen in use.

An international museum of official state cars also exists in France.

Gabon 
Known for his large car interest, former president Omar Bongo, had one of two ever built Stutz Royales. The other one is in Saudi Arabia.

Germany 

Over the years, German presidents, chancellors and senior politicians have often used Mercedes-Benz S-Class vehicles and their predecessor models. The most famous variants were the Mercedes 300 series "Adenauer" and the stretched "Pullman" variants. Currently the State Car of the president of Germany is an armored Mercedes-Benz S600 with license plate 0–1, but the president has also used an Audi A8. The president is (besides the minister of defense) the only German official whose official car regularly shows a flag (a version of the President's standard) placed on the front of the hood.

All officials under close personal protection from the Bundeskriminalamt (BKA), one of Germany's federal police forces, are transported by the BKA pool of armoured cars and BKA driving staff. The car pool includes armored limousines from all German car manufacturers, usually high-end models such as the Audi A8, Volkswagen Phaeton, BMW 7 Series, Porsche Panamera and Mercedes-Benz S-Class.

Some German politicians choose to express their regional origins through the make of car they use. In particular officials from Bavaria customarily prefer cars from Munich-based BMW over the more common Mercedes brand. Some high-ranking politicians from Alliance '90/The Greens (Germany's green party) have chosen Audi, VW or BMW cars. While in office, former chancellor Gerhard Schröder initially used an Audi for his official car, a brand he is known to prefer as his personal car as well. Later during his administrative term, Volkswagen presented him with a VW Phaeton which found its way into the car pool. Before becoming the chancellor, he had been the minister president of Lower Saxony, where Volkswagen is headquartered and is a major employer; and the state government owns several stocks in the company. His successor in office, chancellor Angela Merkel was known to alternate between brands as to project neutrality and support the German car industry in general.

One of the earliest links between a leader and a particular marque was the association of Paul von Hindenburg and Adolf Hitler with Mercedes-Benz. Especially Hitler was known for his love of luxury cars and ordered a succession of custom vehicles from Mercedes, culminating in the 770K model of 1941, which was rumoured to weigh up to five tonnes. These cars and their predecessors were most prominently seen at Nazi parades and Hitler's visits to conquered cities such as Vienna and Paris.

East Germany 

The former East Germany manufactured the Trabant and Wartburg, both deemed unsuitable for state car usage. The leaders of the country used Soviet-made cars and Swedish Volvo models, while the Communist Party general secretary, Erich Honecker, used a fleet of stretched Citroën CX and Volvo 700 Series models.

Greece 
The prime minister of Greece used to use a heavy armoured, custom-built W221 Mercedes-Benz S600 escorted by custom built Mercedes-Benz G-Class vehicles. George Papandreou displaced it with a standard Toyota Prius, followed a little later by a Lexus SUV Hybrid.

The president's vehicle fleet now also includes an armored Mercedes S-Class S500 (W 220), later S500 L (221 series). On official events the car of the president is used.

Past prime ministers have also used a Rolls-Royce Silver Shadow Long-Wheelbase Limousine. The president, also, uses a W221 Mercedes-Benz S600, wearing the Greek coat of arms. The monarchs in the 1930s used a Maybach Zeppelin. The official state car of the king of Greece in the 1960s was a 1959 Rolls-Royce Silver Wraith (LHLW44 chassis).

Grenada 
The governor general of Grenada is driven in a white BMW 750Li with a crown license plate symbolizing the queen while the prime minister drives in a black BMW 750Li bearing a Grenadian flag and a coat of arms license plate, escorted by police motorcycle outriders and two black Prado SUVs.

Guatemala 
The current president of Guatemala is transported in a Chevrolet Suburban, escorted by a motorcade consisting of black Toyota Land Cruiser Prado SUVs.

Guyana 
The president of Guyana is usually transported in a Toyota Crown or Lexus LS 460. For overland work trips into different parts of the country and longer road journeys, the president sometimes uses a Toyota Prado or Toyota Land Cruiser. The vehicle being used by the president - whichever it is - always bears the presidential emblem of a gold cacique's crown in place of the front and rear plates.

The prime minister of Guyana is usually transported in a Toyota Crown. For overland work trips into different parts of the country and longer road journeys, the prime minister typically uses either a Toyota Prado or Toyota Land Cruiser. Similar to the practice surrounding the presidential vehicle, the vehicle being used by the prime minister - whichever it is - bears a gold depiction of coat of arms of Guyana in place of the front and rear plates.

Haiti 
The current president of Haiti rides in his armored 2nd generation Kia Quoris, escorted by a motorcade consisting of Nissan Patrol Y61s donated from the United Nations.

Hong Kong 

The official vehicle of the chief executive of Hong Kong bears no license plate but the Emblem of Hong Kong. This follows the practice of the British governor, as the representative of the British Crown, the laws of Hong Kong did not apply, including the need for a number plate on the car. Hence the official limousine simply had a Crown emblem front and rear in place of number plates. Former chief executive Carrie Lam is usually driven in a BMW 7 Series (G11). Occasionally, the chief executive is also seen using a Toyota Alphard. The Chief Executive may also be escorted by Hong Kong Police Force Escort Group (FEG) using BMW R1200RT motorbikes.

Senior government officials, including the chief secretary, chief justice are assigned a Lexus LS (XF50) while the commissioner of police is assigned a BMW 5 Series (F10) with the number plate "1". The president of the Legislative Council is driven in a Lexus GS450h, with the number plate "LC1".

Prior to 1997, the governor of Hong Kong used a Rolls-Royce Phantom V for ceremonial occasions and a Daimler DS420 limousine for everyday use. Both were removed from Hong Kong by the Royal Navy immediately following the handover to China on 1 July 1997. The Phantom V displayed St Edward's Crown instead of a front license plate.

Hungary 
Hungarian public key dignitaries and security personnel use armored Audi A8Ls.  Also used in official convoys are the Audi A7, Audi Q7, and Audi A6. The prime minister, however, prefers to ride in a Volkswagen Multivan. Members of the government use the Škoda Superb, while lower-ranking officials use Škoda Octavias.

Iceland 
The president of Iceland, Guðni Thorlacius Jóhannesson, is driven by a chauffeur in a Lexus LS600hL with the license plate of "1."
For special occasions the president also uses a 1942 Packard.

India (president) 
The president of India, travels in a black Mercedes S600 Pullman Guard; custom-built to a BR7-level armour standard. The president's motorcade always consists of the former presidential car, a black Mercedes-Benz armoured limousine, which is used as a spare vehicle. The presidential car used to display the National Emblem of India instead of the number plates.

The Vice President of India uses a BMW X5.

India (prime-minister) 

The prime minister of India, the head of the government, uses Land Rover's Range Rover Sentinel with BR7-level with several other decoys. Occasionally, BR7-level highly modified armoured BMW 7 Series (F01) are also used. The prime minister also travels in armored Toyota Land Cruiser and several decoys. The motorcade is escorted by the SPG usually in several Toyota Fortuners, Mahindra Scorpios, BMW X5s, Tata Safaris, Range Rovers, Toyota Land Cruisers, Mercedes-Maybach S650 Guards, and a jammer vehicle along with a Mercedes-Benz Sprinter van which are a permanent part of the prime minister's convoy. When visiting a foreign country, Indian leaders generally use vehicles supplied by the host country. In December 2021, a Mercedes-Maybach S650 Pullman Guard was added to the fleet of the prime minister's official cars.

Indonesia 
The president of Indonesia is driven in one of several armored black Mercedes-Benz S600 Guard bearing the "RI 1" or "INDONESIA 1" license plate and sometimes with the Indonesian flag mounted on the bonnet at formal events. The vice president of Indonesia is driven in a similar car bearing similar attributes.

The president and vice president of Indonesia are escorted by the Paspampres in a number of cars depending on the security detail, where the fleet consists of the majority of Mercedes-Benz G-Class, Nissan X-Trail, Toyota Fortuner, Toyota Land Cruiser models as well as Volkswagen Caravelle and Toyota Alphard carrying a communications jammer device. In addition to the escort cars, the fleet also includes several Toyota HiAce to carry their entourage and additional security forces in Yamaha FZ1 motorcycles.

For trips outside Jakarta the SUV models are preferred to the usual Mercedes sedans. During military exercises, the president of Indonesia is driven in armored personnel carriers bearing the 'INDONESIA 1" license plate, usually in the Anoa. Incumbent president Joko Widodo preferred using the newly acquired Volkswagen Caravelle or Toyota Land Cruiser for trips outside of Jakarta. An older BMW X5 was notably used by former president Susilo Bambang Yudhoyono during the 2007 Jakarta flood.

Cabinet ministers of Indonesia are driven in black Toyota Crown models, escorted by black Nissan X-Trail or Toyota Fortuner vehicles. The Indonesian National Police vehicles, either a motorcycle or an unmarked Nissan X-Trail is always present in all cabinet minister motorcades.

Iran 
The supreme leader and the current president of Iran has used different vehicles over the years ranging from Toyota Cressida, BMW 5 Series and a Peugeot 607. Mahmoud Ahmadinejad used a 1977 Peugeot 504. Cars for diplomatic and official purposes range from various types of Mercedes-Benz, BMW and Peugeot, through to domestically made Samand model Sarir.

Iraq 
The Iraqi president uses a BMW E67 760 Li escorted by Nissan Patrol models. The prime minister uses an armoured Chevrolet Tahoe along with a Toyota Land Cruiser and Chevrolet Suburban.

While in power, Saddam Hussein normally traveled in a white 1988 Mercedes-Benz W126, and also bought a large fleet of luxury cars for himself and his family. Some were classic American cars, many from the era of Al Capone of whom Saddam Hussein was an admirer.

Ireland 
The daily transport for Taoiseach (Prime Minister) Micheál Martin is a dark blue 2019 Lexus LS hybrid. The taoiseach is driven by specially trained and armed members of the Garda Special Detective Unit (SDU). The car the Taoiseach travels in is always accompanied by a follow car, usually an Audi A6 or BMW 5 Series, containing armed close protection officers from the SDU and staff/minders. The taoiseach's car is usually escorted by motorcycle outriders from the Garda Traffic Corps, and further marked and unmarked patrol cars are added to the escort when the Taoiseach is attending sensitive events or during times of a heightened security risk.

The daily transport of the president of Ireland, currently Michael D. Higgins, is a 2017 BMW 7-Series LWB, finished in blue, similar to the background colour of the President's Standard. The president receives the highest protection in the land by law. The president's car is driven by a specially trained and armed member of the Garda Special Branch. The motorcade is led by Garda motorbikes to fend off traffic for the oncoming motorcade. A marked patrol car follows and then the president's car proceeds. Two unmarked cars from the Special Detective Unit follow, they are usually BMW 5 Series, Volvo S90 and/or Audi A6, containing armed bodyguards and the president's staff. The president's aide-de-camp always travels with him in the cavalcade. The convoy occasionally contains a vehicle from the Garda Emergency Response Unit (ERU) for increased security.

The Presidential State Car is a Rolls-Royce Silver Wraith landaulette, license plate ZJ 5000, nicknamed "DeV's car" because of its association with former president Éamon de Valera. It is only used occasionally by the president for ceremonial occasions.

On ceremonial occasions, such as inauguration day, or commemoration events that occur throughout the year, the presidential motorcade receives a Captain's Escort of Honour from the Irish Army's 2nd Cavalry Squadron, consisting of 30 uniformed outriders mounted on motorcycles, currently 2019 Honda 750X models.

When the president or taoiseach visits Northern Ireland, they are driven in armoured vehicles and security in their motorcade increases. The Garda SDU and ERU liaise with the Police Service of Northern Ireland (PSNI) Close Protection Unit (CPU) during visits to Northern Ireland.

Isle of Man 
The official car of the lieutenant governor of the Isle of Man is a black BMW that carries the number plate MAN-1 and, when the lieutenant governor is aboard, it flies the lieutenant governor's standard from a small flag pole at the front of the bonnet, above the grille panels.

Israel 

The official car of the prime minister of Israel is an Audi A8 modified by the Israeli security service to meet security requirements. The prime minister is also escorted by a fleet of Toyota Land Cruisers, Lexus IS 250, and Volvo S80. The president of Israel uses a Volvo stretch limousine and Audi A8.

Italy 

In 1960, the then president of Italy, Giovanni Gronchi, personally ordered custom-built Lancia Flaminia limousines for a state visit by Queen Elizabeth II. Four Lancia Flaminia 355 Presidenziale models were delivered, coachbuilt by Pininfarina with landaulet body on an extended wheelbase. All of the original four cars survive today, with two being leased to different automobile museums and two still in service for the most significant state occasions, like the Republic Day parade or presidential inaugurations.

Sandro Pertini drove a Maserati Quattroporte III during his tenure. The current presidential cars are several armoured Maserati Quattroporte VI, a Lancia Thesis Stola S85 limousine and two identical Audi A8L.

There is also a curious three-wheeled Piaggio Ape Calessino, in service at the presidential summer residence Villa Rosebery and therefore rarely seen. It was donated in 2008 by Roberto Colaninno, head of Piaggio industries, on the 60th anniversary of both the Italian Constitution and Calessino. Its blue livery is decorated with the emblem of the Presidency of the Italian Republic, while the interior is trimmed in wood and white leather.

The government fleet includes a varied array of vehicles, notably Alfa Romeo 159, 166, Stelvio and Giulia, Audi A6 and A8, Bentley Continental Flying Spur, BMW 5 Series and 7 Series, Lancia Thesis and Lancia Thema, Maserati Quattroporte V and VI, Mercedes-Benz W212 and W221 models.

Jamaica 

The official state vehicles of the governor-general of Jamaica and the prime minister of Jamaica are modified BMW 740Li cars bearing the Jamaican flag and the standard of each office respectively. The governor-general's vehicle carries license plates bearing the state crown, whilst the prime minister's car carries the island's standard private license plate. The prime minister also has at his disposal, and often uses in lieu of the state BMW 740Li on a day-to-day basis, two customized Land Rover Discovery vehicles along with dark blue BMW 5 Series for his accompanying security detail. Both chief officials are driven by members of the protective services branch of the Jamaica Constabulary Force.

The Government of Jamaica also maintains a fleet of modified BMW 5 Series as protocol vehicles for visiting heads of state/government, in addition to other foreign dignitaries. Ministers of government generally use a Toyota Prado or Mitsubishi Pajero, bearing either government plates (yellow plates with black numbering) or civilian plates with tags. They are also accompanied by a follow Toyota Rav4 or a vehicle of similar class for their security detail.

Previous vehicles used by holders of these offices include:
 Dark blue BMW 5 Series
 Black Mercedes Benz S600

Japan 

The  currently used by the emperor of Japan and the empress of Japan are specially prepared G51 Toyota Century Royal limousines, four $500,000 custom cars delivered in 2006, and a hybrid G60 Toyota Century convertible parade car built specifically for Naruhito's enthronement in 2019. 

The convertible features rear seat raised  higher than the sedan for greater parade visibility. 

The emperor has previously been transported in multiple vehicles including a Nissan Prince Royal (1967–2008), Cadillac Series 75 (1951–1970), Mercedes-Benz 770 W07 Series (1932–1968), Rolls-Royce Silver Ghost (1921–1936) and a Daimler Landley (1913–1927). From 1935 to 1963, the Imperial Household also possessed a fleet of five 1935 Packard Eights, one of which was Emperor Hirohito's personal car during that period. Naruhito's father, Emperor Akihito, used a 1990 Rolls-Royce Corniche as a parade car for his enthronement ceremony 1989.

The Imperial Household Agency is responsible for maintaining the imperial fleet, including a number of horse drawn state carriages, used for ceremonial events and the presentation of credentials by ambassadors, one of only a few nations that still maintain them.

Since 2020, the prime minister of Japan travels in an armored hybrid G60 Toyota Century, replacing the UVF-46 Lexus LS 600h L acquired in 2008.

Jordan 
The official state car currently used by the king of Jordan is Mercedes-Maybach S600 Pullman, escorted by a motorcade consisting of black Cadillac Escalades and BMW motorcycles.

Kenya 
The president of the Republic of Kenya has several official cars that he uses during his travels. The most common one that he uses is an armoured Mercedes Benz Pullman S600 with the Kenyan coat of arms instead of the licence plate. The other fleet he normally uses from time to time includes an armoured Range Rover Vogue, armoured Toyota Land Cruiser and several other Mercedes-Benz's at his disposal. Additionally, he has an open top military Land Cruiser, covered with bullet proof glass on the side, used during state functions with licence plates CIC (Commander in Chief). For a long time an open top military Land Rover 109 was used during state ceremonies but it was replaced by the Land Cruiser. His escort includes several Mercedes-Benz E-Classes, BMW 5 Series, a Range Rover, Toyota Land Cruisers and an ambulance. Cabinet ministers are supplied with Volkswagen Passats, Mercedes Benz E & S – Classes and Toyota Land Cruisers in addition to other vehicles in the ministerial car pool. The prime minister in office from 2008 to 2013 was equipped with similar vehicles to the president; Mercedes-Benz limousines, Range Rovers and Land Cruisers, however, he had a substantially smaller escort.

Kuwait 
The emir of Kuwait uses a BMW 7 Series or Mercedes-Maybach on a daily basis. His motorcade consists of three identical cars escorted by GMC Yukon Denalis and marked police vehicles. For state occasions he uses a Rolls-Royce or Bentley.

Laos 
Before, Lao government used to ride in luxury cars from Europe such as Mercedes-Benz S-Class, BMW 7 Series and more. In 2016, the former Prime Minister Thongloun Sisoulith announced to change the luxurious expensive official state car to the reasonable affordable car in order to reduce cost of buying more car to serve in office.

Now, the daily transport of the president of Laos is a Toyota Camry (XV50). The prime minister official cars include Toyota Camry (XV50) and Toyota Land Cruiser, while Politburo members also travel in Toyota Camry (XV50).

The official Cabinet ministers and vice minister cars are the Toyota Camry (XV50) and Toyota Land Cruiser Prado respectively. Visiting heads of state or government are chauffeured in a Toyota Camry (XV50) (sometime in remain Mercedes-Benz S-Class and BMW 7 Series).

Latvia 

The president of Latvia travels in a Lexus LS 600h L or a Mercedes-Benz S-Class, with the coat of arms of Latvia as the number plate and front mounted Latvian flag.

Most Latvian Parliament members use Volvo 900 series, Audi A6 and Mercedes-Benz E-Class cars, but Volvo S80s, Volvo S70s and other luxury sedans are also used.

Lebanon 
The president's car is a W221 Mercedes-Benz S600 Guard armored limousine. It is escorted by the Republican Guard's SUVs (Ford Expedition, Chevrolet Suburban and GMC Yukon) and other security vehicles, including the preceding official state car (an armored W140 Mercedes-Benz S600 now possibly used as a back-up limo) as well as other W220 Mercedes-Benz S500L models. Another vehicle that is used sometimes is the J200 Toyota Land Cruiser. The motorcade would be generally escorted by a dozen other Land Cruisers of the same color, as well as the regular Republican Guard's General Motors SUVs. Other government representatives have their own private cars but are still provided with police escorts. The most notable motorcade was Saad Hariri's (when he was prime minister of Lebanon) motorcade, which contained around 25 cars, 6 armoured W222 Mercedes S600, a dozen J200 Land Cruiser, some Chevrolet Tahoe and some Nissan Xterra used as spotting cars.

Liberia 
The current president of Liberia is driven in a black Mercedes-Benz W220 S-class. The presidential car is often escorted by several Nissan SUVs carrying security personnel. Previous presidents, such as Charles Taylor and Samuel Doe, were also driven in Mercedes-Benz cars. Some claim that Doe had purchased over 60 luxury Mercedes, which cost over US$60,000 each.

Lithuania 

The first official Lithuanian state car was bought in 1919 from war-losing Germany. It was a Benz 25/55PS with four cylinder, 6.3-liter engine. The car had a Vytis symbol on the left back door and Lithuanian flags in the front. The car was used by Antanas Smetona and Aleksandras Stulginskis. Later Lithuania bought a French-made Delauney-Belleville 12 CV which was used along with Benz 25/55PS by third Lithuania president Kazys Grinius. After that Antanas Smetona became president of Lithuania again and ordered to buy a new car – Fiat 519, however, it was soon replaced with armored Lincoln K-series due to his wife's wishes. None of these cars remain. After the restoration of Lithuanian independence, leader of the Supreme Council, Vytautas Landsbergis used Soviet-built Čaika M14, after some time it was replaced with armored Opel Senator. Later Lithuania bought armored Mercedes-Benz W126, which was used by Vytautas Landsbergis and Algirdas Brazauskas. The car is now owned by businessman Robertas Dargis. During Algirdas Brazauskas' term of office, two brand-new Audi V8 Lang arrived, they were later replaced with newer version Audi A8 Lang. Valdas Adamkus was driven in a long-wheelbase BMW 7 Series for a short amount of time, however, it was later replaced with a Mercedes-Benz S-Class (W220), which was used until 2013. In 2013, four armoured BMW 7 (F01) were purchased.

Luxembourg 

The grand duke of Luxembourg and his family are driven in an Audi A8 or similar vehicle. The grand duke's car generally displays his personal flag on a flagstaff, and the car bears a registration plate with a large gold crown (from the Luxembourg coat of arms) on a plain white background.

Official cars used by other members of the ruling family of Luxembourg normally display registration plates that have an orange stripe over a blue stripe (the flag of the House of Nassau-Weilburg), without any numbers. For important ceremonial occasions like state visits, there is a Daimler DS420 limousine and also a Bentley Mulsanne. Most of the official cars are painted black or dark blue.

Macau 
The chief executive of Macau is driven in a fleet of government vehicles with special plates reserved for government officials. The fleet consists of European cars, Mercedes-Benz, Audi or Volvo.

Malaysia

Yang di-Pertuan Agong and other sultans 
The Yang di-Pertuan Agong travels in either a stretched red Bentley Arnage, a dark-blue Bentley Continental Flying Spur, or black Maybach 62. 
All the sultans in Malaysia are also transported in official cars bearing their respective royal emblems; common choices include Rolls-Royce Phantom and Mercedes-Benz S-Class, BMW 7 Series, Bentley Mulsanne, Lexus LS and Maybach 62. Yellow Plate with personal logo of the Monarch used by the king and the royal family while Black and white with full title used by the Prime Minister.

Prime Minister 
Under the guidelines of Malaysia's automotive policies, cars for use by federal and state government officials are required to be of national brands primarily Proton. 

The prime minister uses a stretched Proton Perdana which features classified security measures to protect occupants of the vehicle. The Prime Minister of Malaysia normally using the Proton Perdana Executive Limousine as official car to transport within Klang Valley. He will use other official state's car provided by the government of the state. He also used an armoured Toyota Vellfire as his private car. The prime minister is generally escorted by a group of motorcade that comprised a team of Pasukan Gerakan Khas that using the armoured Volvo XC90, Proton X70, Honda CRV SUVs, Honda VFR800 and Kawasaki GTR bikes for the motorcade. Police cars and bikes also in their motorcade.

Malawi 
The former president of Malawi, Bingu wa Mutharika, was driven in an armored Black Mercedes Benz S Class, a Toyota Land Cruiser or Range Rover, the security features remain a state secret. The president traveled in a motorcade of four Hummer H3 and eight escort motorcycles, along with police cars.

Malta 
Among the presidential cars are a pair of Vanden Plas Princess limousines, one dating from 1960 and the other, a convertible, from 1955. Both remain in use for state visits and similar occasions; they were originally imported and used by the British governor of Malta.

Mauritius 
The prime minister of the Republic of Mauritius uses armored BMW 7 Series (760Li & 750Li) and a Nissan Patrol V8 on a daily basis. He is escorted by multiple BMW 5 Series (usually 540i and 550i) and five police motorcycles. The president of the Republic of Mauritius uses a BMW 750Li or a Mercedes S600L. He is escorted by a BMW 5 Series and at least two police motorcycles.

Mexico 
The president and first lady of Mexico both possess a fleet of 30 armoured Chevrolet Suburban, managed by the Estado Mayor Presidencial. 

Under the presidency of Andrés Manuel López Obrador, he later sold the vehicles in an auction for US$3.25 million and since being president, used his Volkswagen Jetta as his mode of transport. As President of Mexico, he sometimes continues to ride in an armored Chevy Suburban

Moldova 
The president, the prime minister, and the speaker of the Parliament of the Republic of Moldova have three long-wheelbase Mercedes Benz S500s at their disposal, all of which were purchased in 2012 and are operated by the State Protection and Guard Service. The vehicles are not armoured.

Morocco 
The king of Morocco, Muhammad VI Normally, when inside Morocco uses his Mercedes 600 Pullman. The royal fleet also includes Range Rover models (when he goes to mountainous places only), Mercedes-Benz S500 and various Lexus models. One BMW 5 Series, which travels in the King's motorcade, contains a communications jammer. An ambulance is always present in the royal motorcade, which is usually escorted by police motorcycles.

The prime minister of Morocco is driven in a Mercedes-Benz S-Class, like all other ministers. The king also has a personal garage, which consists of sports cars, including three Laraki Fulgura models, and an Aston Martin DB7.

Monaco 
In 2011, Prince Albert II acquired a one-off Lexus LS 600h L Landaulet hybrid sedan, making it his official state car. In addition, he owns a variety of eco friendly cars including a Lexus LS 600h, BMW Hydrogen 7, Toyota Prius, Lexus RX 400h, Fisker Karma, Tesla Roadster (2008), and a limited production Venturi Fétish. He also owns a collection of vintage cars, which number over 100, and include prestigious models from Maserati, Jaguar, Mercedes-Benz, Rolls-Royce and Bentley.

Government and escorting security officials drive a fleet of Lexus LS 600h, BMW Motorcycles, and KTM for out riding.

Mongolia 
The president of Mongolia uses a Mercedes Benz S-Class with number plate 0001, the Speaker of the Parliament, an S-Class with number plate 0002 and the prime minister an S-Class with number plate 0003, all escorted by a traffic police car and either a Mercedes-Benz G-Class and Toyota Land Cruiser series 100 or 200, all protected by the State Special Protection Agency.

Montenegro 
The prime minister of Montenegro and senior state officials of Montenegro use a fleet of Audi limousines, notably the Audi A8 models, and lower ranked officials travel in Mercedes-Benz E-Class models. Mercedes M-Class, Volkswagen Passat are also seen. They are escorted by BMW 5-Series, and additional police Mercedes A-class and VW Golf 4 and VW Golf 5.

The first state vehicles were a fleet of vehicles, unknown by model names, probably from Austria-Hungary, Germany, France, Russia and the United Kingdom. They were bought in the period 1908–1910 and most are seen in a 1910 Coronation video from an archive where Knyaz Nikola I Petrović-Njegoš was proclaimed King of Montenegro.

Myanmar 
The current president of Myanmar rides in his Hongqi H9+, escorted by a motorcade consisting of black Range Rover Sports and Harley-Davidson motorcycles.

The chairman of State Peace and Development Council (SPDC), Than Shwe, was driven in a Toyota Crown S180 open-top limousine.

The State Counsellor of Myanmar, Aung San Suu Kyi is transported by armored Mercedes-Benz S-Class and escorted by several Toyota Fortuner security vehicles.

Namibia 
The current president of Namibia, Hage Geingob is driven in a fleet of armoured Mercedes- Benz S600Ls, escorted by 2-3 unmarked Mercedes Benz E500s, Double cab Toyota Hilux 4.0 v6 cars used by the VIPPD and a fleet of police cars. As an offroad vehicle, the president uses armored black Mercedes-Benz ML500s or armored Toyota Land Cruiser 200 Series presidential car always bearing the presidential seal. The vice president of Namibia is driven in an armoured Mercedes-Benz S550 (bearing GRN plate number) or S600 which is escorted by Black Mercedes E250s. As an offroad car, the vice president uses armored Toyota Land Cruiser 200s, under the escort of Toyota Prado V6 VX, Toyota Hilux Double cab 4.0 V6 and police cars. The prime minister of Namibia uses an armored black Mercedes-Benz E500(GRN plates) V8 and Black Toyota Land Cruiser 200 series SUVs. Cabinet ministers and their deputies are driven in Black Mercedes-Benz E400s and E250s and use White toyota Land Cruiser Prado VX V6 or Toyota Hilux Double cab V6 as off-road vehicles (All bearing GRN plates). The current First Lady of Namibia uses a fleet of armored Mercedes Benz E400s, escorted by VIPPD Toyota Corolla 1.8 Exclusive or Hyundai Sonatas. The FLON utilizes Black armored Toyota Land Cruisers Prado VX V6 as off-road vehicles. The two former presidents of Namibia, Nujoma and Pohamba are driven in a fleet of armored Mercedes Benz S550/S500 and Black Toyota Land cruiser 200 series. usually escorted by VIPPD police cars.

Nepal 
The president of Nepal, Bidya Devi Bhandari uses a Mercedes Benz E-Class W210 bulletproof Car for her daily transport, while the Nepalese state car is an armoured stretched Jaguar XJ. The former prime minister of Nepal, Baburam Bhattarai used a Nepali-made Mustang bullet proof Max four-wheel drive.

Netherlands

Dutch Royal Family 

The first car to be owned by the Dutch royal family was a 1908 Renault, purchased by Prince Hendrik. In the years that followed, it would be joined by nine royal limousines from the Amsterdam carriage maker Spijker. Between 1925 and the late 1950s, the royal limousines were supplied by Cadillac, after which the royal household switched to the Ford Motor Company. However, in 1957, a customized Rolls-Royce Silver Wraith was commissioned by Queen Juliana and delivered in 1958.

The official royal limousine is a custom built stretched Audi A8L model, to be used by King Willem Alexander. This stretched A8L is 45 cm longer compared to the normal A8L. A custom-built stretched Volvo S80 limousine is still being used by the former queen, Beatrix. Other members of the royal family use different cars. Visiting heads of state are chauffeured in a stretched and armoured Cadillac DTS, which replaced a 20-year-old Lincoln Town Car.

Other cars are a few non-stretched Volvo S80s and a V70, Audi A6 and A8, and Ford Focus, Mondeo and Galaxy for the royal household. The Royal Stables have also a Ford Scorpio Landaulet, a Mercedes W126 4-door convertible, a blue coach, and a blue Mercedes-Benz Viano and Volkswagen Crafter VIP bus. The royal bodyguards drive Audi A6 models.

All royal automobiles are painted in royal-blue, with standard Dutch number plates, as well as a plate beginning with AA, a special designation for the royal household. Other vehicles used by the royal family are Audi or Mercedes. The members of the royal family have private vehicles also for their own use. King Willem-Alexander has owned a red Volvo XC90 and a Tesla Model X. The late Prince Bernhard, the former queen's father had a collection of Ferraris, and other exotic cars.

Dutch government 
The prime minister of the Netherlands uses an armoured Mercedes-Benz S-Class and sometimes an Audi A6. Previously, an armoured BMW 7 Series was used. Both cars are owned by the Royal and Diplomatic Security Service (DKDB).

New Zealand 

The governor-general travels in a long wheel base BMW 7 Series (F02). Although this vehicle has been debadged, it is most likely a 730LD, consistent with other state BMWs. However, while all other state BMWs are silver, the governor-general's BMW is black. Between 1996 and 2011, the governor-general used a Jaguar XJ Sovereign. Before 1996, governor-general traveled in a Rolls-Royce Phantom VI. During official travel, it is the only vehicle in the country not required to use standard number plates. The official flag of the governor-general is flown on the car used while travelling. The King of New Zealand has his own flag, which is used when he is travelling in the country, but there are no specific cars reserved for his use.

The Prime Minister is driven predominately in the BMW 7-Series 730LD and 750LI, the latter of which is an armoured high security model. From the 1960s up until 2011, the prime minister used to travel in one of two cars, one being a Holden Statesman/Caprice sedan or Ford Fairlane, usually followed by the other vehicle containing their security detail. The prime minister's Wellington-based car has the number plate CR1, and all other cars in the fleet for ministers have number plates starting in the CR series. The main motorcade vehicles usually consist of several Toyota Highlanders operated by the New Zealand Police Diplomatic Protection Service. As of 2020 the NZ Government is purchasing Audi E-trons as the Official Government cars.

Nicaragua 
The president of Nicaragua uses a Mercedes-Benz G-Class. In the past, the Somoza family used several luxury cars during their 43 years in the presidency. A Mercedes-Benz Type 300 was used for official ceremonies. Others were Mercedes-Benz and Cadillac limousines.

Nigeria 
The president of Nigeria and other high-profile government officials use a black armored Mercedes Benz S-Class 2016 model adorned with the Nigerian flag and official party flag. Other luxury cars, like the Toyota Land Cruiser and the Range Rover, all armoured, are used. The president travels in a motorcade of 30 cars and ten escort motorcycles, along with police cars and 6 Mercedes S-550 of SSS surrounding the president's car. Foreign visitors also travel along in the president's car.

North Korea 

The Kim dynasty have long been known for their affection for the Mercedes-Benz brand.

The founder of North Korea, Kim Il-sung, initiated the trend with the purchase of two W100 Mercedes-Benz 600 Landaulets in the 1960s. Daimler-Benz made fifty-nine 600 Landaulets, twelve with a longer convertible roof which (while not an official factory designation) are usually referred to as presidential landaulets. The North Korean 600s have the longer roof. Both Kim Jong-il and Kim Jong-un have continued to use these W100 landaulets for ceremonial occasions.

When Kim Il-sung died in 1994, official state propaganda proclaimed that "1000 cranes descended from the heavens to take Kim Il Sung," while his worldly possessions, including a black Mercedes-Benz W140 500SEL have been entombed at the Mansoosan Memorial Palace where Kim Il-sung's body lies in state.

Kim Jong-il continued the obsession with purchases of Maybach 62s and Mercedes-Benz W221 S600 Pullman Guards, openly flouting UN Sanctions prohibiting the sale of luxury goods.

The UN sanctions were reportedly a sticking point brought up by Kim Jong-un at the 2019 Vietnam Summit, one which he also frequently makes a point of flaunting with his own use of post sanction Mercedes-Maybach W222 S600 Pullman Guards at the summit, and the use of a Rolls-Royce Phantom VII at a summit with United States secretary of state Mike Pompeo.

Kim Jong-un is believed to have a collection of luxury cars including a Range Rover L322 in which he has been seen visiting farms in the countryside following a flood.

North Korean government officials are also known to drive various Audi, Mercedes and Lexus vehicles, mainly the Chinese manufactured Audi A6L, the Mercedes-Benz E-Class and the Lexus GS.

North Macedonia 
The president of North Macedonia is driven by stretched Mercedes-Benz W140. The prime minister of North Macedonia is driven in an armored Mercedes-Benz S600 Guard and escorted by four VW Passat B8.

Norway 

The king and queen use a 2016 Audi A8 L Extended (known as A-2) for formal use, and a stretched Mercedes E-Class (Binz Business) (known as A-7) as HM queen's private limousine. The crown prince and crown princess use a fully electric Mercedes EQS 580 4-matic (known as A-8), a fully electric BMW i7 xDrive60 (known as A-6) and a stretched Volvo S90 T8 Limousine Plug-in Hybrid (known as A-3) all three acquired in late 2022. The royal family of Norway also uses a 2007 Audi A8, an E65 and an E67 BMW 7 Series, a vintage 1966 Lincoln Continental convertible (A-5), one of stretched Cadillac Deville (Superior Commercial Glass). The BMWs are often driven by the king and queen. The king has a private BMW 7-series Hybrid (C-570) and the queen a 2017 Volvo XC 60 with regular plates. The Prime Minister of Norway is driven in a fully armoured Mercedes S600L

Oman 
Sultan Qaboos drove around the country in the following cars:
 2 Maroon-colored 2007 model Mercedes S-Class pullman.
 4 Red-colored 2003 model Mercedes S600 pullman.
 4 Maybach 62
 A number of khaki-colored Range Rover Vogue cars

In addition to this, his garage contained:

 Several Rolls-Royces
 A line of Lamborghinis
 A couple of Ferraris, SRTs and Aston Martins
 More than 20 Mercedes
 Up to 10 BMWs

Pakistan 
The president of Pakistan and prime minister of Pakistan both have armoured fleet of Mercedes-Benz S-Class and BMW 7-Series. The motorcade consists of armoured Toyota Land Cruiser and BMW X5. The prime minister of Pakistan uses a Mercedes-Benz S-Class (W222) guard and the president of Pakistan uses a BMW 7 Series (G11) high security for their official purposes.

Panama 
The president of Panama uses a black armored Chevrolet Suburban. The Ford Explorer and the Toyota Land Cruiser are used for the Institutional Protection Service (S.P.I.) as escort presidential motorcade and 400cc motorcycles. High-security motorcades may include up to ten vehicles.

Paraguay 
The current president of Paraguay rides in his Hongqi H7, escorted by a motorcade consisting of black Nissan Patrol Y61s. For the rural visit, the Paraguayan president using Chevrolet Suburban.

Peru

The president of Peru is driven in a black armoured Lexus LS 460hL. In May 2015, the Lexus was chosen by the president Humala as the official brand of the Government of Peru.

Before, a black Mercedes Benz S600 and a black armoured Hongqi HQ430, which was donated by China, were used.

The prime minister of Peru and the other ministers are driven around in Lexuses.

Philippines 
The presidential limousine is a Mercedes-Benz S600 Guard which was acquired during the term of President Gloria Macapagal Arroyo and still in use. 

The president is always escorted by the Presidential Security Group. The high-security motorcade may involve as many as 25 vehicles, depending on the destination. The official presidential cars are registered and bear the license plate number "1", with the National Flag mounted on the right front fender and the Presidential Standard mounted on the left front fender. Presently, the presidential convoy would consist of the presidential car, an identical backup car, several SUVs, an ambulance, police vehicles and police motorcycle escorts. 

Selected past presidential cars are on permanent display at the Presidential Car Museum within the Quezon Memorial Circle, Quezon City. Former President Emilio Aguinaldo's 1924 Single Six Packard Model 226 is also displayed in the museum.

Official cars used by past presidents include:

 President Emilio Aguinaldo - 1924 Packard Six Touring 
 President Manuel L. Quezon – 1937 Cadillac Series 37-90 Transformable Town Car, 1937 Chrysler Airflow Custom Imperial CW
 President José P. Laurel – 1941 Packard 180
 President Sergio Osmeña – 1941 Cadillac Series 61
 President Manuel Róxas – 1940 Cadillac Fleetwood Series 75 
 Vice presidents Elpidio Quirino and Fernando López – 1946 Packard Clipper
 President Elpidio Quirino – 1949 Cadillac Series 75, 1953 Chrysler Crown Imperial
 President Ramón Magsaysay – 1955 Cadillac Series 75-23 Fleetwood
 President Diosdado Macapagal – 1959 Cadillac de Ville 
 President Ferdinand Marcos (partial list) – Mercedes-Benz 600, 1969 Buick Electra 225, 1974 Cadillac Sixty Special Brougham, 1980 Lincoln Continental Mark VI, Mercedes-Benz 500 SEL
 President Corazon Aquino – Mercedes-Benz 500 SEL
 President Fidel Ramos – Mercedes-Benz 500 SEL Guard 
 President Joseph Estrada – Mercedes-Benz S600
 President Gloria Macapagal Arroyo – Mercedes-Benz S600 (LWB), Mercedes-Benz S600 Guard
 President Benigno Aquino III – Mercedes-Benz S600 Guard, Lexus LX 570 (J200), Toyota Land Cruiser (J200)
 President Rodrigo Duterte – Toyota Land Cruiser (J200)
 President Ferdinand R. Marcos Jr. - Toyota Land Cruiser (J300), Mercedes-Benz S600 Guard, Mercedes Benz S600.

Portugal 

The president of Portugal is usually driven in an armoured Mercedes S600, E67 BMW 760 Li or in a Mercedes-Benz E Class 250 CDI BlueEFFICIENCY. The license plate reads PR with the armillary sphere of Portugal between the P and the R, which stand for 'Presidency of the Republic'.

The prime minister of Portugal is driven in a Mercedes-Benz S350 BlueTec, in a Volkswagen Phaeton 5.0 V10 TDI or in an electric car, Nissan Leaf.

Poland 
The president of Poland, prime minister of Poland and other high officials are protected by State Protection Service (SOP). Both the president and prime minister are entitled to use an armored car and travel in at least a 3-car motorcade (with 6 to 10 guards).

First (Republic of Poland) president Wojciech Jaruzelski used an armored Volvo 760 GLE. Lech Wałęsa used an also stretched Volvo 760 and a Mercedes-Benz 560 SEL W126 stretched limousine and an Audi A8 D2 since 1994. President Aleksander Kwaśniewski for 10 years in office used primarily a fleet of BMW 750iL S (E38). Lech Kaczyński used original and facelifted BMW 7 Series (E67). Bronisław Komorowski was the first president to use Mercedes-Benz S600 Guard (W221) and BMW 760Li High Security (F03) purchased in 2010. Ahead of Polish EU presidency in 2011 a fleet of 14 Audi A8, 9 Audi A6 and 4 Audi Q7 was purchased in late 2010 for BOR. At least two armored Audi A8 L Security (4H) with VR9 protection were delivered in December 2016 for use by President Andrzej Duda. Following destroying one of the cars in 2017, two more Audi A8 L Security were delivered in December 2017. In 2019 SOP purchased an armored Range Rover Sentinel VR8 SUV for occasional use by the president or the prime minister. It joined a white Toyota Land Cruiser V8 used for traveling in unsurfaced terrain.

In 2016 and 2017, there were two serious car accidents involving Polish president and prime minister cars. In the past decade, the BOR had dozens of car collisions, but those cases were kept out of public. On 4 March 2016, President Andrzej Duda's BMW 760Li HS went into a ditch on A4 motorway when its rear tire blew. The accident was blamed for series of procedure violation, while the tire (produced in 2010) was used beyond its two years service life against manufacturer's accordance. Four days after the incident Ministry of Interior settled the tender for 20 new cars, selecting Audi A8L Quattro, but eventually in June 2016 it ordered 20 BMW 750Li xDrive (G12) instead. In 2019 SOP purchased eight Audi A8L Quattro (D5).

On 25 January 2017 a BMW X5 (F15) crashed into the minister of national defense's BMW 750Li xDrive (G12) (both from Military Gendarmerie) in an eight cars pileup on S8 expressway. Due to the upcoming 2016 Warsaw NATO Summit the Military Gendarmerie had purchased 37 new BMW and Audi cars in 2016.

On 10 February 2017 an Audi A8 L Security transporting Prime Minister Beata Szydło hit a tree in Oświęcim at approx. 50 km/h. The prime minister suffered minor injuries, but spent the following week in a military hospital in Warsaw; her security guard suffered leg bone fracture, while the driver was injured. The accident occurred when the government car moving in the three cars motorcade with piloting Audi A6 and closing Audi Q7 using red and blue beacons was overtaking a group of cars on a three-way junction. The Audi driver swerved left to avoid collision with a Fiat Seicento, but still hit the Fiat's bumper, that cut them off while turning left from the priority road, but without using indicator. The Fiat's driver assumed there was only one emergency vehicle. The prosecutor accused the Fiat's 21 years old driver of causing the accident. In 2020 the court found both the Fiat's driver partial guilt, as well as the government motorcade for not using sirens, thus the trial was discontinued. Even before the accident the Ministry of Interior and Administration announced a major reform in The Government Protection Bureau.

In 2014 a 1935 Cadillac Fleetwood 355D used by Marshal of Poland Józef Piłsudski was restored to a driving condition. The only post war communist president Bolesław Bierut had a 1939 Austin Twenty-Eight. Józef Cyrankiewicz, the longest-serving prime minister of Polish People's Republic used cars such as 1953 Buick Skylark, 1961 Jaguar E-Type and 1963 Jaguar Mark X. First Secretary of the PZPR in 1950s and 1960s Władysław Gomułka used cars such as ZIS-110, GAZ-13 Chaika, ZIL-111D and Mercedes W109 300SEL. They both used also the Mercedes-Benz 300d "Adenauer". 1970s prime minister Piotr Jaroszewicz used W109 300 SEL. In 1978 an armored Cadillac Fleetwood Brougham was purchased for First Secretary Edward Gierek. Wojciech Jaruzelski as a first secretary and chairman of the Council of State used armored Peugeot 604 Ti since 1981, Peugeot 505 in 1985 and Volvo 760 GLE since 1986. In the 80s Mercedes-Benz W123 known as "Barrel" was common among nomenklatura. In the 90s common cars among Polish officials included Lancia Thema and Lancia Kappa. Between 1993 and 1995 Prime Minister Waldemar Pawlak replaced his Volvo 760 limousine with Polish made FSO Polonez. Since 2010 the most popular car used by government members officials was Škoda Superb.

Qatar 
The emir of Qatar Tamim bin Hamad Al Thani was seen driven in Bentley Mulsanne Grand Limousine escorted by fleet of Mercedes-Benz S-Class, Mercedes-Benz G-Class, Nissan Frontier and Range Rover. The car was notably seen during the Emir visit to Monaco in 2016.

Romania 
The president of Romania rides in a BMW 7 series, escorted by a motorcade consisting of black BMW 5 Series models.

Since the fall of communism, Ion Iliescu, Emil Constantinescu and Traian Băsescu used the Mercedes-Benz S-Class limousines. After that, president Klaus Iohannis switched to BMW 7 series.

Russia 

For a long time the president of Russia was seen in an armoured Mercedes S-Class stretched limousine as his car. The first such model, a W140 variant, was purchased for Boris Yeltsin and has been superseded by a W221 model. The limousine is bulletproof, has solid rubber tires, and carries an array of communications equipment. On state visits, it is airlifted to the destination using an Ilyushin Il-76.

Historically, presidents Yeltsin and Medvedev were driven in Mercedes-Benz S-Class limousines stretched and armored by the Belgian Carat Duchatelet, while President Putin preferred Mercedes-Benz Guard limousines. For President Medvedev's inauguration a special Carat Duchatelet limousine with raised roof was ordered.

The presidential motorcade is usually escorted by police motorcycle outriders and a series of support vehicles including, but not limited to, the Mercedes G-Class, Mercedes E-Class, standard S-Class models, Mercedes SLK-Class, BMW 5 Series and Volkswagen Caravelle.

Under the USSR, the general secretary of the Communist Party was always driven in a Soviet-built ZIL-41047, escorted by Chaika models. Two of the ZIL limousines are still maintained in the Kremlin garage and occasionally seen in use by the military parades on the Day of Victory.

A new car, Aurus Senat limousine, developed by NAMI as a part of the so-called Unified Modular Platform program (nicknamed "Kortezh", AKA "motorcade", as the development project also includes numerous support vehicles), was rolled out in early 2018, as the new Russian-made state car.

Unlike many other nations no customized license plates are used on an official state car in Russia. Instead, common licence plates are installed, with the numbers from the pools assigned to various official state agencies. The current Aurus Senat limousine, for example, still uses the В776УС/77 plates (from the numbers pool assigned to NAMI for test vehicles) it was fitted with during the state trials in early 2018.

Rwanda 
The president of Rwanda is driven in an Audi A8 or Mercedes S600, escorted by a motorcade consisting of Rwanda National Police special vehicles. President Paul Kagame has been seen in an armoured Range Rover Sentinel.

Saudi Arabia
The Government of Saudi Arabia has many a Mercedes S-600 guard's in which the King often rides, the king of Saudi Arabia even has an S600 Pullman. Some BMW 7-series sedans are also used to welcome guests and politicians. All these cars need to have safety standards, like bullet proof windows, bullet proof tyres and a high-roof. These cars are usually escorted by Toyota Landcruisers, GMC Yukons, Chevrolet Tahoe's and Suburban's, Cadillac Escalades and GMC Sierra 3500HD pickups with rifles mounted in the back. GMC Savanah ambulances also travel with them where ever they go.

Serbia 
The president of Serbia uses an armoured Mercedes-Benz S-Class W221 (S 600 Guard) with B6/B7 resistance level, escorted by two Mercedes-Benz E-Class W212 models.

Singapore 

The president of Singapore usually travels in a white 2022 Mercedes Benz S450L. Previous presidential cars have traditionally been Mercedes S-classes since the 1980s. The first presidential cars in the 60s till the 80s were a pair of Rolls Royce Phantom V. When travelling to official events such as the National Day Parade, the car displays the presidential crest in place of a license plate. Normally, it carries the plate SEP1 indicating Singapore Elected President.

The prime minister usually travels in a silver BMW 750Li. The president, prime minister and speaker of Parliament are the only political appointees to be given official cars. All other ministers of the cabinet travel in their personal cars with no benefits.

The state also maintains a small number of state cars for the transport of visiting dignitaries. These cars carry number plates bearing a single S prefix, following by a single digit and no suffix. (E.g. S1, S2, S3). They include an armoured Audi A8 W12, an armoured BMW 7 series and a Lexus LS460L (the previous official car for the Prime Minister). The number plates are interchangeable and the S1 plate is applied on the Prime Minister's car for certain events such as the National Day Parade.

Historically, presidents of Singapore used the following cars:
1960s to mid-1980s (Presidents Yusof bin Ishak, Benjamin Sheares and Devan Nair) - Rolls-Royce Phantom V
1980s to early 1990s (under Wee Kim Wee) - Mercedes-Benz S-Class (280SEL or 300SEL)
1990s (under Ong Teng Cheong) - Mercedes-Benz 560SEL
2000s (under S.R. Nathan) - Mercedes-Benz S320, Lexus LS430, Mercedes-Benz S350L (2010 to 2011)
2010s (Presidents Tony Tan Keng Yam and Halimah Yacob) - Mercedes-Benz S350L (2012 to 2021)
2020s (under Halimah Yacob) - Mercedes-Benz S450L (2022)

Slovakia 

The president of Slovakia uses various vehicles from the Office for the Protection of Constitutional Officials and Diplomatic Missions which has more than 230 cars for the president, prime minister, ministers and state visits. For state visits, the president uses an armored Mercedes Benz Pullman, for normal driving, one of the 230 cars (armored Audi A8, Mercedes-Benz S-Class, BMW 7 Series, Volkswagen Phaeton, Range Rover, BMW X5, Škoda Superb and other vehicles).

Slovenia 
Slovenian president Borut Pahor uses an Audi A8 and Prime Minister Miro Cerar uses a BMW 7 series while their security officers use BMWs X5 as protection vehicles. The Speaker of Parliament and ministers are mostly driven in Audis A6 or A8 and BMWs 5 series.

Somalia 
The president of Somalia is driven in various state-owned armored vehicles, four black identical armoured Toyota Land Cruiser 200 vehicles are always in the motorcade, for security reasons the president is expected to change vehicle's and they keep on changing position as the motorcade is driven, which is guarded by the Presidential Guard [60th Battalion Military Police]. Instead of a number plate, it features the flag of Somalia.

The same vehicles are used by the prime minister of Somalia, only by policy the motorcade is made up of white vehicles.

South Africa 
The president of South Africa is driven in an armored BMW 7 Series or on occasion a Mercedes-Benz S-Class. A similar car is used by the deputy president of South Africa.

The presidential motorcade is composed of numerous BMW X5, Jeep Grand Cherokee, BMW 3-Series and Mercedes-Benz ML-Class models, followed by a number of Mercedes-Benz V-Class.

South Korea 

The president of South Korea, Moon Jae-in, uses a Hyundai Nexo SUV and a Mercedes-Maybach W222 S600 Guard as his official state cars.

Seven Hyundai Nexo SUV's were purchased in 2018 to replace the three Genesis EQ900 limousines that were provided in 2017 to President Moon Jae-in. These were the first presidential vehicles manufactured in South Korea, offered bulletproofing to a B7/UL8 level, and are equipped with oxygen supply, fire suppression systems, infrared night vision, and run flat tyres. The Genesis limousines were used after the inauguration of Moon.

President Roh Moo-hyun rode in an armoured BMW E65 Security 760Li purchased in 2005 and a 2002 model Mercedes-Benz W220 S600 Guard. Roh used the W220 during peace talks with North Korea. The presidential motorcade was escorted by Chevrolet Tahoe, Chevrolet Suburban and Ford Excursion, also with several identical Mercedes-Benz W220s.

It is believed that Blue House prefers to use the Mercedes vehicles instead of the Genesis in talks with North Korea to present a neutral brand that is also favored by North Korea.

The late president Kim Dae-jung used an armored BMW E38 750iL S, offered by BMW Korea, for his state visit to Mongolia in June 1999, while presidents Rhee, Yun, Park, and Chun used successive models of Cadillac Fleetwood limousines. Kim Dae-jung was the first to switch to German vehicles. Park Geun-hye was the first to officially use a Korean produced vehicle.

The Ministry of Foreign Affairs keeps an armored Cadillac DTS limousine by Alpine Armoring and an armored Hyundai Equus limousine for foreign dignitaries. Each vehicle was acquired between 2010 and 2011.

Spain

Spanish royal family 
The Spanish royal family has access to one of the largest fleets of cars in Spain. Various armoured vehicles are used by the family, including Cadillac Broughams, Audi A6s and Mercedes-Benz S-Class models.

Three Rolls-Royce Phantom IV cars from 1952 are used for major ceremonial occasions, such as state visits. Only eighteen examples of the Phantom IV were ever built, all being reserved for royalty or heads of state. Three were ordered by the Spanish government for the use of General Franco and delivered in 1952. They belong to the Spanish Army and are available for use by members of the royal family. One is a 4-door cabriolet version, and the other two are hard-top limousines. A special order was placed for the wedding of the then-Prince of Asturias (now King Felipe VI), when the Phantom IV cabriolet was rebuilt to include armoured protection. Modifications included heavy-duty air conditioning and a special glazed armoured bubble to protect the rear passengers. The modifications cost over €360,000.

The Spanish royal family uses mainly Mercedes Benz S-Class models for its official transport, with BMW 5 Series cars as escort vehicles. The motorcade is composed of around 15 cars. The personal cars of the former king Juan Carlos I have included a specially customised Maybach 57 S and an Audi RS6.

Spanish government 
The prime minister of Spain and deputy prime minister of Spain both use Audi vehicles. The premier's Audi A8L was purchased in March 2005, shortly after retiring the Audi A8 used by former PM José María Aznar. The vehicle, which then cost the Spanish government well over 380,000 Euros (approx. US$520,000), is said to be equipped with the latest features, runflats, level B7+ armouring, satellite communications and various special items that are kept secret by Spanish officials. The fleet has been renovated and now includes various new Audi A8L, Mercedes-Benz S600 and Audi A6 models, although former prime minister Jose Luis Rodriguez Zapatero wanted to swap those cars for the hybrid Toyota Prius to save fuel oil.

Sri Lanka 
The president of Sri Lanka is driven in an armored Black Mercedes Maybach S-Class (Guard) or armored Black BMW 7 Series escorted by a selection of marked and unmarked President's Security Division vehicles. During official travel it is the only vehicle in the country not required to use standard number plates. The official flag of the president is flown on the car in which the president is travelling.

The prime minister of Sri Lanka is driven in a Black Mercedes-Benz S-Class (Guard) escorted by Prime Minister's Security Division vehicles.

The Chief of Defence Staff in Sri Lanka is usually driven in a Black BMW 7-Series. This is known as the Staff Car of the CDS and consists four silver stars which represents the Rank of the respective officer. Normally the CDS holds the rank of General. This vehicle is formally escorted with two landrover defenders and other VIP Jeeps and sedans depending on the occasion. However, during the recent convoys in 2022 it has been noticed that the Chief of Defence staff has been driven in a Range Rover Autobiography Black LWB.

Sudan 
The president of Sudan, is driven in a Mercedes-Benz S300 W221. The presidential fleet also includes a Nissan Patrol (only when he goes to rural places) and Hyundai Sonata. Ministers usually travel in a Toyota Land Cruiser 70.

Sweden 

The current official car of the king of Sweden is a stretched Volvo S80, escorted by the Swedish Security Service in BMW X5, BMW 5 Series and Mercedes-Benz E-Class models. Saab 9-5 and Volvo XC90 vehicles are also used to transport members of the Swedish royal family.

For significant ceremonial events like state visits, there is a Daimler DS420 limousine. There are also a number of different cars in the Royal Stables, which are used on special occasions. The first royal motor car in Sweden was a Daimler bought in 1899 for Crown Prince Gustaf.

The prime minister of Sweden uses an armored Audi A8 L since 2014. Other cabinet ministers are chauffeured around in an armored BMW 7 Series and several BMW X5s, all escorted by the Swedish Security Service.

Switzerland 
The Swiss federal councillors of Switzerland can buy a new car every four years. They usually have the option between Audi A8 and Mercedes-Benz S-Class models.

Syria 
The president of Syria is driven in various state-owned armored vehicles with Toyota Land Cruiser 70 motorcade. Ministers usually travel in a Toyota Prado.

Taiwan (Republic of China) 

The president of the Republic of China has historically traveled in Cadillac sedans, reflecting the ROC's close relations with the United States. Former president Chiang Kai-shek's two armored Cadillacs are on exhibition in the Chiang Kai-shek Memorial Hall in the capital city of Taipei.

Former president Chen Shui-bian discontinued the use of the Cadillac DeVille, preferring a Lincoln in his first term and a BMW 7 Series in his second term. Former president Ma Ying-jeou used four BMW F03 750Lis, usually escorted by two BMW R1200RTs police bikes, one BMW E65 750i, and two BMW E60 5 Series police cars (one at the front and one at the end).

Since 2016, current president Tsai Ing-wen, uses an Audi A8 L Security.

Tanzania 
The current president of Tanzania uses Kia Quoris, escorted by a motorcade consisting of white Toyota Land Cruiser 70s. For the rural visit, the Tanzanian president using Toyota Land Cruiser Prado.

Zanzibar
The president of Zanzibar is driven in a Mercedes-Benz W221, escorted by a motorcade consisting of four Mitsubishi Pajero SUVs.

Thailand

Thai royal family 
During his time as king, Bhumibol Adulyadej traveled in a Maybach 62 with special plates, with police motorcycle outriders, and an escort of Mercedes Benz S-Class (W221) and Mercedes Benz S-Class (W221) police cars. He usually traveled in different cars. The other models include a Rolls-Royce Phantom VI, a Rolls-Royce Silver Spur stretch limousine, Rolls-Royce Silver Spur Park Ward, Lexus LS460L, BMW 7 Series (E38 and E66), BMW 5 Series (E60), Cadillac DTS stretch limousine, Volkswagen Caravelle T5 TDi, and Mercedes E55 AMG (W211). All of the royal cars are ivory colored.

Sirikit, the queen mother, mostly travels by a Cadillac DTS stretch limousine and a modified Volkswagen Caravelle T4 TDi.

King Maha Vajiralongkorn and Queen Suthida usually travel by Rolls-Royce cars. These Rolls-Royces used to be the previous king's former official cars. The Rolls-Royce collection includes a Rolls-Royce Phantom V, Rolls-Royce Phantom VI, and Rolls-Royce Silver Spur stretch limousine. They also travel by Maybach 62, Mercedes Benz S-Class Pullman Guard W222, Mercedes Maybach W222, Mercedes Maybach W223 and Bentley Mulsanne.

Princess Maha Chakri Sirindhorn usually travels by Lexus LS600hL, and Mercedes S-Class (W221 and W222). For unofficial royal journeys, she travels in a modified Mercedes Viano.

Other royal family members mostly travel by Mercedes S-Class (W221 and W222), ivory colored, for official journeys, with Mercedes-Benz S-Class (W222) police escorts. A tourist during the early 1990s confirmed that a mid-1980s Chevrolet Suburban (presumably a 1985 model) is used by the security detail of the Crown Prince. 

Princess Bajarakitiyabha sometimes drives herself in a red Mini Cooper S and a lime-green Volkswagen New Beetle with the motorcade.

There are also royal cars in a convertible form for royal ceremonies, such as a Rolls-Royce Corniche and a Cadillac DTS (the hard top was transformed into a convertible top).

On official royal journeys, there are a group of more than 45 cars in the motorcade including Mercedes Benz S-Class (W221 and W222), BMW 7 Series (F01 and G11) in red color, Mercedes Benz Vito and Volkswagen Caravelle in ivory color.

For unofficial royal journeys, the cars in the motorcade are a group of about 15 cars including BMW 7 Series (F01 and G11), Mercedes Benz S-Class (W221 and W222), Honda Accord and Nissan Teana. These cars are all ivory colored.

The Bureau of the Royal Household also has its own vehicles. These cars are mostly Nissan Teana and Mercedes Benz S-Class (W221 and W222). These cars are painted in ivory.

The royal department has several type of cars, Toyota Corolla Altis 1.6 G, Toyota Camry Hybrid, Toyota Hilux Revo, Nissan Navara, Toyota Fortuner, Isuzu MU-X, Toyota Coaster and Toyota Commuter. They are mostly painted silver or white, with the registration plates in yellow with the text "RENTED VEHICLE JEEP USE ส.น.ว.xxxx" in green.

Thai prime minister 
In March 2016, Prime Minister Prayut Chan-o-cha was the recipient of two new armoured Mercedes-Benz S600 Guard sedans, worth 19.5 million baht each. They were among four new luxury armoured cars, costing 78 million baht total, procured by the Secretariat of the Prime Minister. One was equipped with license plate 4 Kor Dor 29 (4กต 29), the other with 4 Kor Tor 29 (4กท 29). One will serve as Gen Prayut's car for daily use with the other one as a backup. Two other S600 Guard sedans are reserved for high-profile foreign visitors. Gen Prayut's position entitles him to an armored van, which he sometimes uses. He travels by a Volkswagen Caravelle on some occasions.

Thai ministers mostly travel in Mercedes S-Class, Toyota Alphard, Volkswagen Caravelle, and Jaguar XJs.

Tonga 
For official travel, the king uses the Humber Pullman with landaulette body, released in 1949. Previously, King George Tupou V traveled around the country in the classic 'black cab', the Austin FX4.

Trinidad and Tobago 

The president and prime minister of Trinidad and Tobago each use a black, armoured, 2008 Toyota Crown. It carries the license plate with a gold coat of arms for the president and PM-1 for the prime minister. Each motorcade also includes a decoy car, two police motorcycles, two 2008 Toyota Land Cruisers as support vehicles and a leading Toyota Camry police vehicle.

Turkey 

Government officials generally use Mercedes S-Class, BMW 7 Series, Audi A8 or Toyota Land Cruiser models. All ambassadors of Turkey serving abroad are required to use bulletproof cars that are provided by the government with trained security personnel. This measure is taken because of previous assassination attempts to Turkish ambassadors. The president of Turkey uses a Mercedes Maybach S-600 Pullman Guard.

Turkish Republic of Northern Cyprus (recognised only by Turkey) 
President Rauf Denktaş had a red BMW 750 Li with gold crests replacing the number plate.

Uganda 
Ugandan presidents have usually preferred to ride in European cars. Edward Mutesa, first president of Uganda, drove in a 1960s Rolls-Royce. All succeeding ones drove in black Mercedes Benz limousines.

President Yoweri Museveni drove in a black Mercedes cross country and 600 SEL stretch Limos up to the mid-1990s.
His convoy now consists of a Toyota Land Cruiser 200 presidential car. The presidency has ceremonial cars that include a stretch 600 SEL Mercedes, and a white G Wagon. Escorts travel on double cabin pick up trucks and Mitsubishi Pajero models.

Ukraine 
The president of Ukraine uses an armoured Mercedes-Benz S-Class and an armoured Volkswagen Phaeton Model 2011 in a W12 long version, and for the motorcade, armoured Porsche Cayenne by Centigon.

United Kingdom 

Five state cars (two Bentleys and three Rolls-Royces) are kept at the Royal Mews, Buckingham Palace, for use by the King and those representing or supporting him as head of state. There are also two State Royal Review Vehicles (open-top Range Rovers) designed for use at military parades and similar events. The State Cars are sometimes used when the king is travelling abroad, and they are also made available for heads of state visiting the UK, as well as for senior members of the royal family on official duties. As British law in general does not apply to the sovereign, these vehicles do not possess registration plates. Other official vehicles kept at the Mews include Jaguar and Daimler limousines (for less formal occasions), Land Rovers, luggage brakes and minibuses. These do have number plates (as do the monarch's personal vehicles and those of other members of the royal family). One state car is usually on display at the Royal Mews, where state road vehicles (including the horse-drawn carriages) are kept and maintained. The state cars and official limousines are painted claret and black, and have fittings on the roof for a shield and flagpole.

Current state cars 

Since his accession to the throne, King Charles III has made regular use of the 1978 Rolls-Royce Phantom VI state limousine (which was presented to his mother Queen Elizabeth II by the Society of Motor Manufacturers and Traders to mark the occasion of her Silver Jubilee). He has also made use of the oldest of the State cars, a rare Rolls-Royce Phantom IV (which was purchased by his mother in 1950 and became a state car upon her accession to the throne in 1952). The other state cars (all of which remain in use) are a 1987 Rolls-Royce Phantom VI, and a pair of custom-built Bentley State Limousines (made in 2002 to commemorate the Golden Jubilee of Elizabeth II). 

The Bentley State Limousines regularly conveyed Queen Elizabeth II to and from official events during the last two decades of her reign. The state limousines are  longer than a standard Bentley Arnage,  taller and  wider. They are equipped with broad rear-hinged doors that open almost 90 degrees. The car also has opaque rear window panels that can be removed to allow increased visibility when the occupant is attending a public event or installed for increased privacy when required.

The State Royal Review Vehicle is a bespoke 2015 Range Rover Hybrid used for parades and other official rides; the King and other members of the royal family can stand up in the back for good visibility. This is the latest in a series of royal review vehicles, which have been built by Land Rover since 1953. The current vehicle replaces a 2002 model (which remains in use as the second royal review vehicle).

Other official vehicles
The official fleet is augmented by three Range Rovers (with number plates MYT 1, MYT 2 and MYT 3), acquired in 2022, two stretched Jaguar XJ limousines (with number plates NGN 1 and NGN 2), acquired in 2012, and three Daimler DS420 limousines (also with number plates), acquired in 1988 and 1992. Used on less formal occasions (or as support vehicles on more formal occasions), these are all painted in claret and black, and have fittings for a mascot, roof flag and shield.

On formal occasions, King Charles, when he was Prince of Wales, was often seen in a claret and black 1962 Rolls-Royce Phantom V Landaulet (registration plate NLT 1), which he inherited from Queen Elizabeth the Queen Mother and later had converted with a fixed roof in place of the former open top.

British government 

The prime minister of the United Kingdom is usually driven in one of a fleet of armoured Range Rover Sentinel models, escorted by Range Rover, Land Rover Discovery and Ford Galaxy vehicles and police motorcycle outriders.

Senior ministers and government figures with police protection as well as visiting foreign dignitaries also receive armoured cars.

All former prime ministers since 1975 have been provided with an armoured car, usually the same model as the current prime minister, along with police protection. , John Major, Tony Blair and Gordon Brown were provided with cars.

The British government maintains the Government Car Service which provides transport for senior government officials. In December 2008, the service took delivery of a fleet of armoured BMW 760Li models for use by senior dignitaries and visiting politicians. The service also uses vehicles from Jaguar, Land Rover, Ford and Vauxhall, while some ministers use Toyota Prius hybrid models.

Since the premiership of Prime Minister Boris Johnson, custom made blast and bullet-proof Land Rover Sentinel have also been added in the government fleet.

United Kingdom Overseas Territories

British Virgin Islands 
The governor of the British Virgin Islands is driven in a grey Royal Service Range Rover from the United Kingdom with a license plate symbolizing the Crown, usually by a police officer from the RVIPF (Royal Virgin Islands Police Force).

Cayman Islands 
The governor of the Cayman Islands is driven in a beige Cadillac DeVille sedan. Surmounted on the hood is the flag of the office, and instead of license plates the car has a crown on the front and back. It is likely that the car is armoured but this is not known for certain. Other senior officials and visiting VIPs use a fleet of armoured Ford Excursions.

Gibraltar 

The chief minister of Gibraltar is driven in a black Tesla Model S with a 'G1' Gibraltarian license plate.

The governor of Gibraltar uses a black Jaguar XJ with a British Crown plate in silver.

United States 

The president of the United States travels in a heavily armored, custom-built limousine, which is often referred to as Limo One, Cadillac One, or its less formal nickname of "the Beast." The vehicle is based on a GMC Topkick platform, and has the outward appearance of an enlarged Cadillac DTS limousine, with styling elements from other vehicles in the Cadillac lineup.

The vehicle features bulletproof windows, state-of-the-art communication and protection systems, a stowable desk, and a gas-proof chamber for defense against gas attacks. It was retired in 2018 for a new presidential limo, described as an "evolutionary update" of the vehicle used from 2009 to 2017 with a current Cadillac front fascia.

On 24 May 2011, an earlier "Beast" failed to clear the driveway of the U.S. Embassy compound in Dublin, Ireland. Though President Barack Obama was the escorted official, he was in the second limo as the first noisily struck the pavement hump under the Embassy gate. The president also travels in a heavily armored 2007–2014 model Chevrolet Suburban and a spare.

Unlike most other heads of state, with the occasional exception of the British monarch and the president of Russia, the U.S. president is accompanied on all foreign and domestic trips by a full motorcade of U.S. government vehicles, including several presidential limousines, escort vehicles and a military ambulance, all of which are transported by the United States Air Force using C-17 Globemaster III aircraft. For security reasons, the president always travels in "the Beast" on trips abroad. The U.S. vehicles are typically complemented with coaches, police vehicles, ambulances and limousines provided by local authorities. The United States Secret Service also has a fleet of heavily armored buses called Ground Force One for the President and Vice President. 

Like the president, the U.S. vice president is accompanied by a full U.S. motorcade during domestic and foreign trips.

Members of Congress have an allowance of $1,000 per month in which the government may cover the cost of a lease, not including mobile offices. The preferred car for members of Congress was the Lincoln Town Car until its discontinuation. Executive cars are the most common type of car for congressmen. The two most popular cars for congressmen are the Town Car's successors: the MKS and the MKT.

Most high ranking federal-level officials travel in SUVs usually armored Chevrolet Suburbans or Chevrolet Tahoe. State governors and large city mayors mostly travel in SUVs with their state and city police security details.
 
Visiting heads of state and foreign dignitaries are provided armored vehicles and protection by the United States Secret Service and Diplomatic Security Service in US soil. The annual United Nations General Assembly session in New York is one such event where hundreds of motorcades are managed with the assistance of NYPD.

U.S. ambassadors travel in their United States Department of State pool of armored vehicle that can range from Cadillac DTS, Chevrolet Suburban, Toyota Land Cruiser and BMW along with host security vehicles.

Puerto Rico 
Current governor Alejandro García Padilla has chosen a black Chrysler 300 from his government's pool of vehicles confiscated from criminals and sold to the governor's office for a nominal $2,000. The former governor of Puerto Rico used a Chevrolet Tahoe Hybrid. Ford Expeditions, Toyota Sequoias, and Nissan Armadas are available in the fleet from previous administrations. As part of the current governor's motorcade, two large black SUVs, one white Ford Crown Victorias and at least one police motorcycle are used. They carry standard Puerto Rico license plates. Former governor Luis Fortuño's specialty plate had the "LGF-051" numeration.

Governor Luis Muñoz Marín (1949–1965) used an armored Packard given to him by President Harry S Truman, which is on exhibition at the Muñoz Marín Foundation Library and Museum. Governor Rafael Hernández Colón (1973–1977, 1985–1993) ordered an armored Ford station wagon for which he was severely criticized and, thus, rarely used.

Each sitting governor has the right to change the gubernatorial fleet as he or she may see fit, for example, Pedro Rosselló used a Mercury Grand Marquis and a GMC Yukon, Sila Calderón used a Ford Expedition and sometimes, for special occasions, a Buick Park Avenue, while Aníbal Acevedo Vilá used Nissan Armadas. As a tradition full size cars were used but since the late 1990s, SUVs are being used.

Former governors are entitled to an official vehicle, replaced every four years, during their lifetime.

Uruguay 
The presidential state car of Uruguay is an armoured 2005 Chevrolet Vectra, purchased by president Tabaré Vázquez when his term in office began on 1 March 2005. Previously, the Uruguayan head of state traveled in a Mitsubishi Galant procured from the government's fleet of diplomatic vehicles.

As of August 2007, the presidential motor pool includes Mitsubishi Galants, Toyota Corollas, Volkswagen Ventos, and Rover 75s.

Municipal intendants of Uruguay are transported in armored Peugeot 607s.

After 2010, the official state car was no longer used. President Jose Mujica instead drives a Volkswagen Beetle.

President Luis Lacalle Pou most of the time uses a white 4x4 Toyota Hilux SW4, and is escorted by one or more presidential security cars.

Uzbekistan 
The state limousines of Uzbekistan are two special ordered 2010 Range Rover Supercharged with bulletproof windows. Also, the president of the Republic of Uzbekistan is transported by an armored Mercedes-Benz S-class which is escorted by other similar vehicles.

Vatican 

As the Vatican's sovereign, the pope was traditionally carried on an elaborate sedan chair during ceremonial occasions or transported in a horse drawn carriage. 

With the international reach of the Catholic church in modern times, the motorized Popemobile has replaced the carriage as the favored mode of transportation when greeting the millions of Catholic devotees during state visits. 

The first motorized papal vehicle was a Mercedes-Benz W08 Nurberg 460 Pullman limousine, made for Pope Pius XI in 1930. Mercedes has provided about a third of all papal vehicles used by the Vatican such as the contemporary W163 Mercedes M-Class featuring its distinctive glass enclosure surrounding the rear seat. 

There have been many different designs for popemobiles since Pope Paul VI used a modified Lincoln Continental to greet crowds in New York City in 1965. Some are open air, while others have bulletproof glass walls to enclose the pope, deemed necessary after the 1981 assassination attempt of Pope John Paul II. Some allow the pope to sit, while others are designed to accommodate him standing. The variety of popemobiles allows the Roman Curia to select an appropriate one for each usage depending upon the level of security needed, distance, speed of travel, and the pope's preferences.

When visiting regions with domestic automobile production, the pope often makes an attempt to commission a vehicle from that country such as the SEAT Panda for John Paul II's trip to Spain, a Jeepney for Francis' trip to the Philippines, and Kia Sedona for his trip to South Korea.

For daily driving, the Vatican uses an armoured Mercedes-Benz S-Class and a custom-made Lancia Thesis, as well as a custom-made electric Renault Kangoo for use around Castel Gandolfo. All the popemobiles and limousines have registration SCV 1.

Venezuela 
Hugo Chávez, president until his death in 2013, sometimes drove a red IKCO Samand badged Centauro, or in red or green a Tiuna truck accompanied with some ministers or governors or mayors, depending on the occasion when he travelled, usually with a high security personnel around, with a large convoy of armored SUV conformed by Ford Explorer, Chevrolet Suburban, Chevrolet Tahoe, Chevrolet Trailblazer, Chevrolet Express, Ford Expedition, Toyota 4Runner, Toyota Fortuner, Toyota Sequoia, Jeep Grand Cherokee, and an ambulance in case of emergency, and escorted by the Presidential Guard, using armored Toyota Land Cruiser (80&90 Series), the transit police and the Venezuelan National Guard motorcycle officers have the duty to escort the motorcade and to clear up the traffic.

Another fleet of vehicles includes a Cadillac Fleetwood that is used for national holidays like special parades, also the president used 3 armoured black (W211), these vehicles have license plates with the national emblem, but are used for special occasions or important meetings when Hugo Chávez met with other presidents. Another vehicle is an armored silver Lincoln Town Car used to transport the president's visitors from the Simón Bolívar International Airport of Maiquetia to the Palacio de Miraflores and back.

The vice president is usually driven in an armored Nissan Patrol with a motorcade of 4 or 5 SUVs. Ministers usually travel in armored vehicles including Chevrolet Impala, Chevrolet Trailblazer, Chevrolet Tahoe, Jeep Grand Cherokee, Toyota 4Runner, Toyota Camry, Toyota Fortuner, Ford Fusion, Ford Explorer, Ford Expedition, also escorted by Venezuelan National Guard officers.

The last acquisition to the fleet is a Bentley Continental Flying Spur.

President Nicolas Maduro is driving a black Toyota 4Runner or a Ford Explorer or a Toyota Fortuner often accompanied with the Venezuela Presidential Honor Guard motorcade with his assistants and ministers.

Vietnam 
The president of Vietnam is driven in a bulletproof Toyota Land Cruiser. The General Secretary of the Vietnam Communist Party travels in a 1998 Toyota Crown. The prime minister uses Toyota Land Cruiser as well. Usually on long-distance or special occasions, the motorcade includes some police motorbikes, several Toyota Land Cruiser and Toyota Camry. Ministers usually travel in Toyota Camry, Toyota Fortuner and VinFast Lux A 2.0. All government cars have blue licence plates but some have white civil license plates with a government placard behind the windshield.

Yemen 
The president of Yemen is driven in various state-owned armored vehicles. Ministers usually travel in a Toyota Prado.

Yugoslavia 
President Josip Broz Tito used a custom-built Mercedes-Benz 600 limousine with a removable top for most functions. Tito also had several luxury cars in his private motor pool collection, including: numerous Mercedes Benz models, including a 770k seized from Ante Pavelić after WWII, a Rolls-Royce Phantom V, and several Cadillac and Chevrolet models.

Zambia 
As of July 2011, the president of Zambia was driven in an armoured Mercedes-Benz S600 Pullman limousine, escorted by 30 officers of the Zambia Police Service trained in diplomatic protection on BMW motorcycles and in six BMW 3 Series E93 cars. His motorcade also included an ambulance at all times. For visits to rural areas, the president uses an armoured Toyota Land Cruiser 100 Series.

Zimbabwe
The president of Zimbabwe, Emmerson Mnangagwa, has been seen in various armoured vehicles, including a Mercedes-Benz GLE-Class and a Mercedes-Benz S-Class. His motorcade includes Mercedes-Benz C-Class marked as police cars, as well as various other vehicles transporting his security detail. The president uses 1952 Rolls-Royce Silver Wraith as ceremonial state car.  Mthakawazi The king of the Matebe Nation uses a Toyota Hilux, while chiefs use Toyota Land Cruisers.

See also 

 Air transports of heads of state and government
 Royal train
 Royal yacht
 Royal barge
 Royal Mews#Royal and State Carriages

References

External links
 Official and Ceremonial Vehicles of World Leaders

Armoured vehicles
Limousines